The following is a list of players, both past and current, who appeared at least in one game for the Golden State Warriors NBA franchise. Players in bold denote whose jersey number was retired by the Warriors. Current as of the end of 2020–21 NBA season.

Players

A

|-
|align="left"| || align="center"|F || align="left"|Indiana || align="center"|3 || align="center"|– || 147 || 2,480 || 415 || 167 || 788 || 16.9 || 2.8 || 1.1 || 5.4 || align=center|
|-
|align="left"| || align="center"|F || align="left"|UConn || align="center"|1 || align="center"| || 23 || 196 || 58 || 10 || 57 || 8.5 || 2.5 || 0.4 || 2.5 || align=center|
|-
|align="left"| || align="center"|C || align="left"|UConn || align="center"|1 || align="center"| || 74 || 1,114 || 270 || 36 || 377 || 15.1 || 3.6 || 0.5 || 5.1 || align=center|
|-
|align="left"| || align="center"|F/C || align="left"|Iowa State || align="center"|4 || align="center"|– || 271 || 5,658 || 1,355 || 251 || 2,502 || 20.9 || 5.0 || 0.9 || 9.2 || align=center|
|-
|align="left"| || align="center"|G || align="left"|Indiana || align="center"|1 || align="center"| || 57 || 868 || 69 || 83 || 359 || 15.2 || 1.2 || 1.5 || 6.3 || align=center|
|-
|align="left"| || align="center"|F || align="left"|Marshall || align="center"|1 || align="center"| || 27 || 232 || 56 || 10 || 48 || 8.6 || 2.1 || 0.4 || 1.8 || align=center|
|-
|align="left"| || align="center"|F || align="left"|UNLV || align="center"|1 || align="center"| || 36 || 166 || 45 || 10 || 67 || 4.6 || 1.3 || 0.3 || 1.9 || align=center|
|-
|align="left"| || align="center"|F/C || align="left"|UNLV || align="center"|1 || align="center"| || 46 || 691 || 185 || 17 || 200 || 15.0 || 4.0 || 0.4 || 4.3 || align=center|
|-
|align="left"| || align="center"|G || align="left"|Arizona || align="center"|2 || align="center"|– || 129 || 4,021 || 518 || 688 || 2,008 || 31.2 || 4.0 || 5.3 || 15.6 || align=center|
|-
|align="left" bgcolor="#FFFF99"|^ || align="center"|G/F || align="left"|Villanova || align="center"|10 || align="center"|–– || 713 || 24,897 || 6,129 || 1,665 || 16,266 || 38.4 || 8.6 || 2.3 || 22.8 || align=center|
|-
|align="left"| || align="center"|G || align="left"|Iowa || align="center"|3 || align="center"|– || 135 || 3,341 || 265 || 533 || 1,418 || 24.7 || 2.0 || 3.9 || 10.5 || align=center|
|-
|align="left"| || align="center"|F/C || align="left"|Michigan State || align="center"|1 || align="center"| || 19 || 110 || 39 || 3 || 28 || 5.8 || 2.1 || 0.2 || 1.5 || align=center|
|-
|align="left"| || align="center"|F/C || align="left"|UConn || align="center"|1 || align="center"| || 15 || 97 || 47 || 5 || 25 || 6.5 || 3.1 || 0.3 || 1.7 || align=center|
|-
|align="left"| || align="center"|G/F || align="left"|Memphis || align="center"|2 || align="center"|– || 87 || 1,581 || 244 || 201 || 531 || 18.2 || 2.8 || 2.3 || 6.1 || align=center|
|-
|align="left" bgcolor="#FFFF99"|^ (#16) || align="center"|G || align="left"|North Carolina A&T || align="center"|11 || align="center"|– || 711 || 17,826 || 2,463 || 2,483 || 6,328 || 25.1 || 3.5 || 3.5 || 8.9 || align=center|
|-
|align="left"| || align="center"|G || align="left"|Kentucky || align="center"|4 || align="center"|– || 205 || 5,007 || 829 || 230 || 2,171 || 24.4 || 4.0 || 1.1 || 10.6 || align=center|

B
|-
|align="left"| || align="center"|F || align="left"|Oregon || align="center"|2 || align="center"|– || 157 || 3,371 || 757 || 191 || 1,241 || 21.5 || 4.8 || 1.2 || 7.9 || align=center|
|-
|align="left"| || align="center"|G || align="left"|Brazil || align="center"|2 || align="center"|– || 134 || 2,061 || 208 || 181 || 900 || 15.4 || 1.6 || 1.4 || 6.7 || align=center|
|-
|align="left"| || align="center"|F || align="left"|North Carolina || align="center"|4 || align="center"|– || 307 || 8,622 || 1,422 || 447 || 3,087 || 28.1 || 4.6 || 1.5 || 10.1 || align=center|
|-
|align="left"| || align="center"|F || align="left"|UCLA || align="center"|3 || align="center"|– || 169 || 3,637 || 765 || 340 || 1,346 || 21.5 || 4.5 || 2.0 || 8.0 || align=center|
|-
|align="left"| || align="center"|G/F || align="left"|Oregon || align="center"|3 || align="center"|– || 239 || 6,104 || 727 || 819 || 2,847 || 25.5 || 3.0 || 3.4 || 11.9 || align=center|
|-
|align="left"| || align="center"|C || align="left"|Memphis || align="center"|1 || align="center"| || 2 || 9 || 1 || 0 || 4 || 4.5 || 0.5 || 0.0 || 2.0 || align=center|
|-
|align="left"| || align="center"|G || align="left"|Georgia Tech || align="center"|1 || align="center"| || 8 || 85 || 8 || 17 || 22 || 10.6 || 1.0 || 2.1 || 2.8 || align=center|
|-
|align="left"| || align="center"|G || align="left"|Georgia Tech || align="center"|1 || align="center"| || 68 || 712 || 63 || 85 || 257 || 10.5 || 0.9 || 1.3 || 3.8 || align=center|
|-
|align="left" bgcolor="#FFFF99"|^ (#24) || align="center"|F || align="left"|Miami (FL) || align="center"|8 || align="center"|–– || 642 || 24,443 || 4,655 || 3,247 || 16,447 || 38.1 || 7.3 || 5.1 || 25.6 || align=center|
|-
|align="left"| || align="center"|C || align="left"|Oregon State || align="center"|1 || align="center"| || 38 || 165 || 60 || 3 || 34 || 4.3 || 1.6 || 0.1 || 0.9 || align=center|
|-
|align="left"| || align="center"|F || align="left"|Illinois || align="center"|1 || align="center"| || 8 || 46 || 7 || 4 || 18 || 5.8 || 0.9 || 0.5 || 2.3 || align=center|
|-
|align="left" bgcolor="#CCFFCC"|x || align="center"|G/F || align="left"|Old Dominion || align="center"|3 || align="center"|– || 172 || 1,868 || 291 || 150 || 705 || 10.9 || 1.7 || 0.9 || 4.1 || align=center|
|-
|align="left"| || align="center"|G || align="left"|Louisville || align="center"|2 || align="center"|– || 161 || 4,655 || 705 || 645 || 1,853 || 28.9 || 4.4 || 4.0 || 11.5 || align=center|
|-
|align="left"| || align="center"|G/F || align="left"|Penn || align="center"|6 || align="center"|– || 361 || 6,972 || 1,168 || 654 || 2,299 || 19.3 || 3.2 || 1.8 || 6.4 || align=center|
|-
|align="left"| || align="center"|F/C || align="left"|LIU Brooklyn || align="center"|1 || align="center"| || 24 ||  ||  || 7 || 60 ||  ||  || 0.3 || 2.5 || align=center|
|-
|align="left"| || align="center"|G/F || align="left"|Italy || align="center"|2 || align="center"|– || 75 || 1,123 || 85 || 103 || 467 || 15.0 || 1.1 || 1.4 || 6.2 || align=center|
|-
|align="left"| || align="center"|G || align="left"|Michigan State || align="center"|1 || align="center"| || 19 || 171 || 18 || 13 || 32 || 9.0 || 0.9 || 0.7 || 1.7 || align=center|
|-
|align="left" bgcolor="#CCFFCC"|x || align="center"|F || align="left"|Oregon || align="center"|3 || align="center"|– || 126 || 1,612 || 396 || 180 || 486 || 12.8 || 3.1 || 1.4 || 3.9 || align=center|
|-
|align="left"| || align="center"|G || align="left"|FIU || align="center"|1 || align="center"| || 1 || 23 || 2 || 3 || 11 || 23.0 || 2.0 || 3.0 || 11.0 || align=center|
|-
|align="left"| || align="center"|F/C || align="left"|Israel || align="center"|1 || align="center"| || 9 || 195 || 53 || 19 || 81 || 21.7 || 5.9 || 2.1 || 9.0 || align=center|
|-
|align="left"| || align="center"|C || align="left"|Oakland || align="center"|1 || align="center"| || 3 || 9 || 3 || 0 || 0 || 3.0 || 1.0 || 0.0 || 0.0 || align=center|
|-
|align="left"| || align="center"|C || align="left"|Latvia || align="center"|9 || align="center"|– || 510 || 11,101 || 3,614 || 467 || 3,244 || 21.8 || 7.1 || 0.9 || 6.4 || align=center|
|-
|align="left"| || align="center"|F || align="left"|Washington State || align="center"|1 || align="center"| || 56 ||  ||  || 92 || 467 ||  ||  || 1.6 || 8.3 || align=center|
|-
|align="left"| || align="center"|C || align="left"|Indiana || align="center"|1 || align="center"| || 40 || 481 || 99 || 24 || 83 || 12.0 || 2.5 || 0.6 || 2.1 || align=center|
|-
|align="left"| || align="center"|G || align="left"|Maryland || align="center"|1 || align="center"| || 28 || 607 || 56 || 102 || 122 || 21.7 || 2.0 || 3.6 || 4.4 || align=center|
|-
|align="left"| || align="center"|G || align="left"|Oklahoma || align="center"|3 || align="center"|– || 177 || 5,410 || 594 || 1,065 || 1,701 || 30.6 || 3.4 || 6.0 || 9.6 || align=center|
|-
|align="left"| || align="center"|F || align="left"|Cincinnati || align="center"|1 || align="center"| || 38 || 918 || 315 || 51 || 259 || 24.2 || 8.3 || 1.3 || 6.8 || align=center|
|-
|align="left"| || align="center"|G || align="left"|Temple || align="center"|4 || align="center"|– || 227 || 2,478 || 405 || 488 || 1,052 || 21.2 || 2.4 || 2.1 || 4.6 || align=center|
|-
|align="left"| || align="center"|G || align="left"|Wake Forest || align="center"|2 || align="center"|– || 95 || 2,268 || 204 || 461 || 524 || 23.9 || 2.1 || 4.9 || 5.5 || align=center|
|-
|align="left"| || align="center"|C || align="left"|Utah || align="center"|5 || align="center"|– || 247 || 5,723 || 2,006 || 532 || 1,514 || 23.2 || 8.1 || 2.2 || 6.1 || align=center|
|-
|align="left"| || align="center"|C || align="left"|Bridgeport || align="center"|3 || align="center"|– || 160 || 3,160 || 750 || 63 || 475 || 19.8 || 4.7 || 0.4 || 3.0 || align=center|
|-
|align="left"| || align="center"|G || align="left"|Missouri || align="center"|1 || align="center"| || 16 || 409 || 28 || 50 || 117 || 25.6 || 1.8 || 3.1 || 7.3 || align=center|
|-
|align="left"| || align="center"|F/C || align="left"|Muhlenberg || align="center"|2 || align="center"|– || 75 ||  ||  || 53 || 342 ||  ||  || 0.7 || 4.6 || align=center|
|-
|align="left"| || align="center"|F/C || align="left"|Temple || align="center"|1 || align="center"| || 24 ||  || 24 || 4 || 64 ||  || 1.0 || 0.2 || 2.7 || align=center|
|-
|align="left"| || align="center"|F || align="left"|Oregon || align="center"|1 || align="center"| || 1 || 1 || 1 || 0 || 0 || 1.0 || 1.0 || 0.0 || 0.0 || align=center|
|-
|align="left"| || align="center"|G || align="left"|Boston College || align="center"|1 || align="center"| || 45 || 1,015 || 121 || 131 || 335 || 22.6 || 2.7 || 2.9 || 7.4 || align=center|
|-
|align="left"| || align="center"|G || align="left"|Eastern Michigan || align="center"|1 || align="center"| || 68 || 1,321 || 88 || 221 || 600 || 19.4 || 1.3 || 3.3 || 8.8 || align=center|
|-
|align="left"| || align="center"|G || align="left"|Tulsa || align="center"|1 || align="center"| || 42 || 340 || 38 || 52 || 133 || 8.1 || 0.9 || 1.2 || 3.2 || align=center|
|-
|align="left"| || align="center"|G || align="left"|Stanford || align="center"|2 || align="center"|– || 138 || 2,174 || 201 || 374 || 848 || 15.8 || 1.5 || 2.7 || 6.1 || align=center|
|-
|align="left"| || align="center"|G || align="left"|St. Bonaventure || align="center"|1 || align="center"| || 5 || 40 || 3 || 12 || 8 || 8.0 || 0.6 || 2.4 || 1.6 || align=center|
|-
|align="left"| || align="center"|F || align="left"|Villanova || align="center"|1 || align="center"| || 11 || 52 || 5 || 2 || 10 || 4.7 || 0.5 || 0.2 || 0.9 || align=center|
|-
|align="left"| || align="center"|G || align="left"|Arkansas || align="center"|2 || align="center"|– || 66 || 1,611 || 120 || 75 || 662 || 24.4 || 1.8 || 1.1 || 10.0 || align=center|
|-
|align="left"| || align="center"|F/C || align="left"|Kansas || align="center"|1 || align="center"| || 15 || 108 || 40 || 4 || 31 || 7.2 || 2.7 || 0.3 || 2.1 || align=center|
|-
|align="left"| || align="center"|G/F || align="left"|Providence || align="center"|1 || align="center"| || 7 || 15 || 5 || 0 || 13 || 2.1 || 0.7 || 0.0 || 1.9 || align=center|
|-
|align="left"| || align="center"|F || align="left"|NC State || align="center"|1 || align="center"| || 6 || 74 || 18 || 5 || 24 || 12.3 || 3.0 || 0.8 || 4.0 || align=center|
|-
|align="left"| || align="center"|F || align="left"|Glynn Academy (GA) || align="center"|1 || align="center"| || 9 || 187 || 57 || 4 || 57 || 20.8 || 6.3 || 0.4 || 6.3 || align=center|
|-
|align="left"| || align="center"|F/C || align="left"|Mississippi State || align="center"|3 || align="center"|– || 177 || 2,583 || 708 || 56 || 928 || 14.6 || 4.0 || 0.3 || 5.2 || align=center|
|-
|align="left"| || align="center"|F || align="left"|South Philadelphia HS (PA) || align="center"|2 || align="center"| || 34 || 141 || 17 || 10 || 104 || 9.4 || 1.1 || 0.3 || 3.1 || align=center|
|-
|align="left"| || align="center"|F/C || align="left"|Columbia || align="center"|1 || align="center"| || 63 || 1,126 || 232 || 91 || 254 || 17.9 || 3.7 || 1.4 || 4.0 || align=center|
|-
|align="left"| || align="center"|G/F || align="left"|Arizona || align="center"|3 || align="center"|– || 121 || 1,626 || 255 || 120 || 572 || 13.4 || 2.1 || 1.0 || 4.7 || align=center|
|-
|align="left"| || align="center"|G || align="left"|Colorado || align="center"|1 || align="center"| || 48 || 1,390 || 226 || 151 || 773 || 29.0 || 4.7 || 3.1 || 16.1 || align=center|
|-
|align="left"| || align="center"|G/F || align="left"|UConn || align="center"|1 || align="center"| || 29 || 457 || 79 || 35 || 143 || 15.8 || 2.7 || 1.2 || 4.9 || align=center|
|-
|align="left"| || align="center"|G || align="left"|Iona || align="center"|1 || align="center"| || 47 || 418 || 28 || 20 || 197 || 8.9 || 0.6 || 0.4 || 4.2 || align=center|
|-
|align="left"| || align="center"|G || align="left"|Georgia Tech || align="center"|1 || align="center"| || 15 || 162 || 12 || 19 || 54 || 10.8 || 0.8 || 1.3 || 3.6 || align=center|
|}

C

|-
|align="left"| || align="center"|F || align="left"|Serbia || align="center"|2 || align="center"|– || 98 || 969 || 210 || 45 || 428 || 9.9 || 2.1 || 0.5 || 4.4 || align=center|
|-
|align="left"| || align="center"|F || align="left"|Alabama || align="center"|3 || align="center"|– || 135 || 3,748 || 858 || 168 || 1,475 || 27.8 || 6.4 || 1.2 || 10.9 || align=center|
|-
|align="left"| || align="center"|F || align="left"|Purdue || align="center"|1 || align="center"| || 76 || 1,634 || 317 || 103 || 733 || 21.5 || 4.2 || 1.4 || 9.6 || align=center|
|-
|align="left"| || align="center"|F || align="left"|Memphis || align="center"|1 || align="center"| || 25 || 331 || 47 || 11 || 125 || 13.2 || 1.9 || 0.4 || 5.0 || align=center|
|-
|align="left"| || align="center"|G || align="left"|Southern Illinois || align="center"|1 || align="center"| || 7 || 74 || 13 || 3 || 39 || 10.6 || 1.9 || 0.4 || 5.6 || align=center|
|-
|align="left" bgcolor="#FFCC00"|+ || align="center"|F/C || align="left"|Purdue || align="center"|7 || align="center"|–– || 491 || 17,429 || 4,068 || 957 || 9,996 || 35.5 || 8.3 || 1.9 || 20.4 || align=center|
|-
|align="left"| || align="center"|F || align="left"|Israel || align="center"|1 || align="center"| || 53 || 740 || 200 || 51 || 300 || 14.0 || 3.8 || 1.0 || 5.7 || align=center|
|-
|align="left"| || align="center"|C || align="left"|Kentucky || align="center"|1 || align="center"| || 41 || 940 || 255 || 60 || 323 || 22.9 || 6.2 || 1.5 || 7.9 || align=center|
|-
|align="left" bgcolor="#FFFF99"|^ (#13) || align="center"|C || align="left"|Kansas || align="center"|6 || align="center"|– || 429 || 20,231 || 10,768 || 1,303 || 17,783 || bgcolor="#CFECEC"|47.2 || bgcolor="#CFECEC"|25.1 || 3.0 || bgcolor="#CFECEC"|41.5 || align=center|
|-
|align="left"| || align="center"|G/F || align="left"|Indiana || align="center"|3 || align="center"|– || 176 || 3,466 || 445 || 219 || 945 || 19.7 || 2.5 || 1.2 || 5.4 || align=center|
|-
|align="left"| || align="center"|G || align="left"|California || align="center"|1 || align="center"| || 9 || 82 || 8 || 7 || 29 || 9.1 || 0.9 || 0.8 || 3.2 || align=center|
|-
|align="left"| || align="center"|F || align="left"|Washington || align="center"|2 || align="center"|– || 61 || 1,223 || 378 || 116 || 561 || 20.0 || 6.2 || 1.9 || 9.2 || align=center|
|-
|align="left"| || align="center"|G/F || align="left"|Georgetown || align="center"|1 || align="center"| || 4 || 20 || 3 || 1 || 6 || 5.0 || 0.8 || 0.3 || 1.5 || align=center|
|-
|align="left"| || align="center"|G || align="left"|Belmont || align="center"|2 || align="center"|– || 143 || 1,715 || 189 || 154 || 763 || 12.0 || 1.3 || 1.1 || 5.3 || align=center|
|-
|align="left"| || align="center"|G || align="left"|Hofstra || align="center"|2 || align="center"|– || 106 || 3,096 || 309 || 553 || 1,238 || 29.2 || 2.9 || 5.2 || 11.7 || align=center|
|-
|align="left"| || align="center"|F/C || align="left"|Rice || align="center"|1 || align="center"| || 65 ||  || 401 || 110 || 570 || 0.0 || 6.2 || 1.7 || 8.8 || align=center|
|-
|align="left"| || align="center"|C || align="left"|Boise State || align="center"|1 || align="center"| || 6 || 32 || 5 || 2 || 2 || 5.3 || 0.8 || 0.3 || 0.3 || align=center|
|-
|align="left"| || align="center"|F || align="left"|Houston Baptist || align="center"|1 || align="center"| || 72 || 1,801 || 376 || 100 || 464 || 25.0 || 5.2 || 1.4 || 6.4 || align=center|
|-
|align="left"| || align="center"|G || align="left"|Virginia Tech || align="center"|4 || align="center"|– || 181 || 4,659 || 417 || 745 || 1,417 || 25.7 || 2.3 || 4.1 || 7.8 || align=center|
|-
|align="left"| || align="center"|G/F || align="left"|Washington State || align="center"|1 || align="center"| || 61 || 957 || 129 || 67 || 440 || 15.7 || 2.1 || 1.1 || 7.2 || align=center|
|-
|align="left"| || align="center"|G/F || align="left"|Fordham || align="center"|2 || align="center"|– || 147 || 2,257 || 417 || 208 || 858 || 15.4 || 2.8 || 1.4 || 5.8 || align=center|
|-
|align="left"| || align="center"|G || align="left"|Oregon State || align="center"|4 || align="center"|– || 272 || 6,660 || 834 || 1,066 || 2,060 || 24.5 || 3.1 || 3.9 || 7.6 || align=center|
|-
|align="left"| || align="center"|G || align="left"|Duke || align="center"|2 || align="center"|– || 107 || 1,799 || 239 || 205 || 821 || 16.8 || 2.2 || 1.9 || 7.7 || align=center|
|-
|align="left"| || align="center"|F/C || align="left"|New Orleans || align="center"|2 || align="center"|– || 144 || 2,576 || 787 || 63 || 1,168 || 17.9 || 5.5 || 0.4 || 8.1 || align=center|
|-
|align="left"| || align="center"|G || align="left"|Niagara || align="center"|2 || align="center"| || 91 || 2,574 || 372 || 314 || 665 || 28.3 || 4.1 || 3.5 || 7.3 || align=center|
|-
|align="left"| || align="center"|F || align="left"|California || align="center"|1 || align="center"| || 24 || 160 || 19 || 12 || 68 || 6.7 || 0.8 || 0.5 || 2.8 || align=center|
|-
|align="left"| || align="center"|F || align="left"|Southern Miss || align="center"|1 || align="center"| || 7 || 70 || 17 || 2 || 22 || 10.0 || 2.4 || 0.3 || 3.1 || align=center|
|-
|align="left"| || align="center"|F/C || align="left"|Kentucky || align="center"|1 || align="center"| || 30 || 771 || 247 || 107 || 488 || 25.7 || 8.2 || 3.6 || 16.3 || align=center|
|-
|align="left"| || align="center"|F || align="left"|Louisville || align="center"|2 || align="center"|– || 74 || 813 || 206 || 23 || 342 || 11.0 || 2.8 || 0.3 || 4.6 || align=center|
|-
|align="left"| || align="center"|G || align="left"|Michigan || align="center"|1 || align="center"| || 54 || 2,087 || 176 || 240 || 1,064 || 38.6 || 3.3 || 4.4 || 19.7 || align=center|
|-
|align="left"| || align="center"|G || align="left"|Xavier || align="center"|1 || align="center"| || 42 || 661 || 63 || 57 || 354 || 15.7 || 1.5 || 1.4 || 8.4 || align=center|
|-
|align="left"| || align="center"|C || align="left"|Boston College || align="center"|1 || align="center"| || 1 || 1 || 0 || 0 || 0 || 1.0 || 0.0 || 0.0 || 0.0 || align=center|
|-
|align="left"| || align="center"|F || align="left"|Providence || align="center"|1 || align="center"| || 44 || 457 || 104 || 30 || 173 || 10.4 || 2.4 || 0.7 || 3.9 || align=center|
|-
|align="left"| || align="center"|C || align="left"|Purdue || align="center"|1 || align="center"| || 45 || 354 || 82 || 22 || 166 || 7.9 || 1.8 || 0.5 || 3.7 || align=center|
|-
|align="left"| || align="center"|G || align="left"|Penn || align="center"|3 || align="center"|– || 147 ||  ||  || 223 || 694 ||  ||  || 1.5 || 4.7 || align=center|
|-
|align="left"| || align="center"|F || align="left"|DePaul || align="center"|2 || align="center"|– || 72 || 1,409 || 362 || 79 || 638 || 19.6 || 5.0 || 1.1 || 8.9 || align=center|
|-
|align="left"| || align="center"|G || align="left"|Pittsburgh || align="center"|2 || align="center"|– || 141 || 3,288 || 321 || 474 || 1,189 || 23.3 || 2.3 || 3.4 || 8.4 || align=center|
|-
|align="left"| || align="center"|F || align="left"|Boston College || align="center"|2 || align="center"|– || 39 || 436 || 79 || 17 || 124 || 11.2 || 2.0 || 0.4 || 3.2 || align=center|
|-
|align="left" bgcolor="#FBCEB1"|* || align="center"|G || align="left"|Davidson || align="center"|12 || align="center"|– || 762 || 26,150 || 3,503 || bgcolor="#CFECEC"|4,984 || bgcolor="#CFECEC"|18,434 || 34.3 || 4.6 || 6.5 || 24.2 || align=center|
|}

D

|-
|align="left"| || align="center"|F || align="left"|Duquesne || align="center"|1 || align="center"| || 14 || 112 || 22 || 5 || 35 || 8.0 || 1.6 || 0.4 || 2.5 || align=center|
|-
|align="left"| || align="center"|F || align="left"|Stanford || align="center"|3 || align="center"|– || 146 ||  ||  || 340 || 1,408 ||  ||  || 2.3 || 9.6 || align=center|
|-
|align="left"| || align="center"|C || align="left"|Mississippi State || align="center"|7 || align="center"|– || 425 || 11,724 || 3,298 || 431 || 4,039 || 27.6 || 7.8 || 1.0 || 9.5 || align=center|
|-
|align="left"| || align="center"|F || align="left"|Alabama || align="center"|1 || align="center"| || 14 || 111 || 34 || 1 || 42 || 7.9 || 2.4 || 0.1 || 3.0 || align=center|
|-
|align="left"| || align="center"|G || align="left"|UCLA || align="center"|4 || align="center"|– || 227 || 8,376 || 1,005 || 1,845 || 4,567 || 36.9 || 4.4 || 8.1 || 20.1 || align=center|
|-
|align="left"| || align="center"|F/C || align="left"|Clemson || align="center"|1 || align="center"| || 36 || 577 || 153 || 23 || 112 || 16.0 || 4.3 || 0.6 || 3.1 || align=center|
|-
|align="left"| || align="center"|F || align="left"|Houston || align="center"|2 || align="center"|– || 105 || 1,418 || 320 || 75 || 459 || 13.5 || 3.0 || 0.7 || 4.4 || align=center|
|-
|align="left"| || align="center"|G/F || align="left"|Texas Tech || align="center"|1 || align="center"| || 23 || 464 || 84 || 38 || 143 || 20.2 || 3.7 || 1.7 || 6.2 || align=center|
|-
|align="left"| || align="center"|F/C || align="left"|Texas A&M || align="center"|5 || align="center"|– || 299 || 5,057 || 1,311 || 220 || 1,431 || 16.9 || 4.4 || 0.7 || 4.8 || align=center|
|-
|align="left"| || align="center"|F/C || align="left"|Florida || align="center"|2 || align="center"|– || 93 || 1,268 || 337 || 41 || 434 || 13.6 || 3.6 || 0.4 || 4.7 || align=center|
|-
|align="left"| || align="center"|C || align="left"|USC || align="center"|1 || align="center"| || 4 || 6 || 0 || 0 || 1 || 1.5 || 0.0 || 0.0 || 0.3 || align=center|
|-
|align="left"| || align="center"|G || align="left"|NC State || align="center"|1 || align="center"| || 29 || 396 || 31 || 62 || 77 || 13.7 || 1.1 || 2.1 || 2.7 || align=center|
|-
|align="left"| || align="center"|G || align="left"|Kentucky || align="center"|2 || align="center"|– || 110 || 2,277 || 224 || 264 || 1,019 || 20.7 || 2.0 || 2.4 || 9.3 || align=center|
|-
|align="left"| || align="center"|G || align="left"|Pacific || align="center"|1 || align="center"| || 2 || 11 || 0 || 1 || 4 || 5.5 || 0.0 || 0.5 || 2.0 || align=center|
|-
|align="left"| || align="center"|G || align="left"|King's || align="center"|5 || align="center"|– || 281 || 5,310 || 1,025 || 675 || 1,404 || 18.9 || 3.6 || 2.4 || 5.0 || align=center|
|-
|align="left"| || align="center"|F || align="left"|Georgetown || align="center"|1 || align="center"| || 11 || 67 || 13 || 1 || 46 || 6.1 || 1.2 || 0.1 || 4.2 || align=center|
|-
|align="left"| || align="center"|F || align="left"|Cincinnati || align="center"|5 || align="center"|– || 296 || 5,125 || 1,527 || 336 || 1,894 || 17.3 || 5.2 || 1.1 || 6.4 || align=center|
|-
|align="left"| || align="center"|F/C || align="left"|Cincinnati || align="center"|1 || align="center"| || 30 || 565 || 196 || 30 || 240 || 18.8 || 6.5 || 1.0 || 8.0 || align=center|
|-
|align="left"| || align="center"|F || align="left"|Arizona State || align="center"|2 || align="center"|– || 86 || 1,253 || 292 || 34 || 609 || 14.6 || 3.4 || 0.4 || 7.1 || align=center|
|-
|align="left"| || align="center"|G || align="left"|Florida State || align="center"|1 || align="center"| || 24 || 265 || 26 || 19 || 88 || 11.0 || 1.1 || 0.8 || 3.7 || align=center|
|-
|align="left"| || align="center"|G || align="left"|Washington || align="center"|4 || align="center"|– || 306 || 5,554 || 997 || 1,098 || 1,756 || 18.2 || 3.3 || 3.6 || 5.7 || align=center|
|-
|align="left"| || align="center"|G || align="left"|Detroit Mercy || align="center"|1 || align="center"| || 5 || 49 || 3 || 5 || 18 || 9.8 || 0.6 || 1.0 || 3.6 || align=center|
|-
|align="left"| || align="center"|G/F || align="left"|Duke || align="center"|5 || align="center"|– || 356 || 9,840 || 1,677 || 883 || 3,778 || 27.6 || 4.7 || 2.5 || 10.6 || align=center|
|-
|align="left"| || align="center"|G || align="left"|Utah State || align="center"|1 || align="center"| || 28 || 206 || 31 || 28 || 70 || 7.4 || 1.1 || 1.0 || 2.5 || align=center|
|-
|align="left" bgcolor="#FFCC00"|+ || align="center"|G/F || align="left"|Texas || align="center"|3 || align="center"|– || 208 || 7,097 || 1,474 || 1,123 || 5,374 || 34.1 || 7.1 || 5.4 || 25.8 || align=center|
|-
|align="left"| || align="center"|F || align="left"|Colorado State || align="center"|1 || align="center"| || 5 || 78 || 14 || 4 || 21 || 15.6 || 2.8 || 0.8 || 4.2 || align=center|
|}

E to F

|-
|align="left"| || align="center"|G/F || align="left"|American International || align="center"|2 || align="center"|– || 109 || 2,301 || 336 || 218 || 851 || 21.1 || 3.1 || 2.0 || 7.8 || align=center|
|-
|align="left"| || align="center"|G/F || align="left"|San Francisco || align="center"|8 || align="center"|– || 524 || 10,374 || 2,686 || 716 || 4,623 || 19.8 || 5.1 || 1.4 || 8.8 || align=center|
|-
|align="left"| || align="center"|G || align="left"|Lanier HS (MS) || align="center"|7 || align="center"|– || 413 || 14,726 || 1,525 || 1,818 || 8,087 || 35.7 || 3.7 || 4.4 || 19.6 || align=center|
|-
|align="left"| || align="center"|C || align="left"|Wyoming || align="center"|2 || align="center"|– || 100 || 729 || 201 || 22 || 161 || 7.3 || 2.0 || 0.2 || 1.6 || align=center|
|-
|align="left"| || align="center"|F || align="left"|Norfolk State || align="center"|1 || align="center"| || 13 || 72 || 5 || 2 || 26 || 5.5 || 0.4 || 0.2 || 2.0 || align=center|
|-
|align="left"| || align="center"|G/F || align="left"|UCLA || align="center"|1 || align="center"| || 64 || 646 || 162 || 38 || 233 || 10.1 || 2.5 || 0.6 || 3.6 || align=center|
|-
|align="left"| || align="center"|G/F || align="left"|Cincinnati || align="center"|2 || align="center"|– || 57 || 618 || 66 || 54 || 168 || 10.8 || 1.2 || 0.9 || 2.9 || align=center|
|-
|align="left"| || align="center"|C || align="left"|Vanderbilt || align="center"|3 || align="center"|– || 170 || 2,394 || 725 || 63 || 712 || 14.1 || 4.3 || 0.4 || 4.2 || align=center|
|-
|align="left"| || align="center"|F || align="left"|CCNY || align="center"|1 || align="center"| || 27 ||  ||  || 18 || 83 ||  ||  || 0.7 || 3.1 || align=center|
|-
|align="left"| || align="center"|F || align="left"|Nebraska || align="center"|1 || align="center"| || 74 || 1,199 || 295 || 74 || 465 || 16.2 || 4.0 || 1.0 || 6.3 || align=center|
|-
|align="left"| || align="center"|F || align="left"|Florida State || align="center"|1 || align="center"| || 7 || 27 || 6 || 1 || 6 || 3.9 || 0.9 || 0.1 || 0.9 || align=center|
|-
|align="left"| || align="center"|C || align="left"|UTEP || align="center"|1 || align="center"| || 70 || 1,128 || 335 || 53 || 458 || 16.1 || 4.8 || 0.8 || 6.5 || align=center|
|-
|align="left"| || align="center"|G/F || align="left"|Georgia Tech || align="center"|2 || align="center"|– || 58 || 507 || 53 || 26 || 99 || 8.7 || 0.9 || 0.4 || 1.7 || align=center|
|-
|align="left"| || align="center"|G || align="left"|St. John's || align="center"|3 || align="center"|– || 142 || 3,397 || 548 || 566 || 1,042 || 23.9 || 3.9 || 4.0 || 7.3 || align=center|
|-
|align="left"| || align="center"|G || align="left"|Little Rock || align="center"|2 || align="center"|– || 156 || 4,811 || 429 || 653 || 1,966 || 30.8 || 2.8 || 4.2 || 12.6 || align=center|
|-
|align="left"| || align="center"|G/F || align="left"|NYU || align="center"|5 || align="center"|– || 262 || 882 || 152 || 429 || 1,512 || 26.7 || 4.6 || 1.6 || 5.8 || align=center|
|-
|align="left"| || align="center"|G || align="left"|Manhattan || align="center"|1 || align="center"| || 15 || 73 || 2 || 11 || 32 || 4.9 || 0.1 || 0.7 || 2.1 || align=center|
|-
|align="left" bgcolor="#FFCC00"|+ || align="center"|G || align="left"|Georgetown || align="center"|6 || align="center"|– || 374 || 12,690 || 1,224 || 2,518 || 6,607 || 33.9 || 3.3 || 6.7 || 17.7 || align=center|
|-
|align="left"| || align="center"|G || align="left"|Maryland Eastern Shore || align="center"|1 || align="center"| || 35 || 210 || 15 || 22 || 134 || 6.0 || 0.4 || 0.6 || 3.8 || align=center|
|-
|align="left"| || align="center"|F || align="left"|Cincinnati || align="center"|3 || align="center"|– || 100 || 2,642 || 1,070 || 144 || 1,023 || 26.4 || 10.7 || 1.4 || 10.2 || align=center|
|-
|align="left"| || align="center"|C || align="left"|Colgate || align="center"|10 || align="center"|– || 641 || 12,224 || 3,227 || 325 || 2,816 || 19.1 || 5.0 || 0.5 || 4.4 || align=center|
|-
|align="left"| || align="center"|F/C || align="left"|Western Kentucky || align="center"|2 || align="center"|– || 110 || 1,842 || 391 || 126 || 741 || 16.7 || 3.6 || 1.1 || 6.7 || align=center|
|-
|align="left"| || align="center"|F/C || align="left"|Grambling State || align="center"|1 || align="center"| || 2 || 9 || 5 || 1 || 1 || 4.5 || 2.5 || 0.5 || 0.5 || align=center|
|-
|align="left"| || align="center"|G || align="left"|Guilford || align="center"|3 || align="center"|– || 162 || 5,866 || 451 || 869 || 3,788 || 36.2 || 2.8 || 5.4 || 23.4 || align=center|
|-
|align="left" bgcolor="#FFFF99"|^ || align="center"|F/C || align="left"|Murray State || align="center"|8 || align="center"|– || 489 || 4,490 || 1,379 || 587 || 8,003 || 23.4 || 5.3 || 1.2 || 16.4 || align=center|
|-
|align="left"| || align="center"|C || align="left"|NC State || align="center"|2 || align="center"|– || 132 || 1,562 || 445 || 34 || 531 || 11.8 || 3.4 || 0.3 || 4.0 || align=center|
|}

G

|-
|align="left"| || align="center"|C || align="left"|UCLA || align="center"|1 || align="center"| || 28 || 297 || 86 || 11 || 79 || 10.6 || 3.1 || 0.4 || 2.8 || align=center|
|-
|align="left"| || align="center"|G || align="left"|Elizabeth City State || align="center"|1 || align="center"| || 75 || 1,793 || 189 || 261 || 421 || 23.9 || 2.5 || 3.5 || 5.6 || align=center|
|-
|align="left"| || align="center"|F || align="left"|Oregon State || align="center"|1 || align="center"| || 73 || 951 || 244 || 55 || 526 || 13.0 || 3.3 || 0.8 || 7.2 || align=center|
|-
|align="left"| || align="center"|F || align="left"|Providence || align="center"|1 || align="center"| || 3 || 11 || 7 || 1 || 0 || 3.7 || 2.3 || 0.3 || 0.0 || align=center|
|-
|align="left"| || align="center"|F/C || align="left"|Utah || align="center"|3 || align="center"|– || 151 || 507 || 349 || 245 || 1,339 || 18.8 || 4.0 || 1.6 || 8.9 || align=center|
|-
|align="left"| || align="center"|G || align="left"|Missouri State || align="center"|3 || align="center"|– || 197 || 5,674 || 666 || 1,091 || 2,246 || 28.8 || 3.4 || 5.5 || 11.4 || align=center|
|-
|align="left"| || align="center"|G || align="left"|Memphis || align="center"|1 || align="center"| || 8 || 149 || 12 || 18 || 19 || 18.6 || 1.5 || 2.3 || 2.4 || align=center|
|-
|align="left"| || align="center"|C || align="left"|Indiana || align="center"|1 || align="center"| || 5 || 31 || 10 || 1 || 8 || 6.2 || 2.0 || 0.2 || 1.6 || align=center|
|-
|align="left"| || align="center"|F/C || align="left"|Old Dominion || align="center"|5 || align="center"|– || 311 || 5,488 || 1,584 || 174 || 2,847 || 17.6 || 5.1 || 0.6 || 9.2 || align=center|
|-
|align="left"| || align="center"|G/F || align="left"|Augsburg || align="center"|1 || align="center"| || 45 || 761 || 114 || 32 || 242 || 16.9 || 2.5 || 0.7 || 5.4 || align=center|
|-
|align="left" bgcolor="#FFCC00"|+ || align="center"|G || align="left"|La Salle || align="center"|6 || align="center"|– || 396 || 13,494 || 1,818 || 1,835 || 4,250 || 34.1 || 4.6 || 4.6 || 10.7 || align=center|
|-
|align="left"| || align="center"|C || align="left"|Alabama A&M || align="center"|1 || align="center"| || 18 || 224 || 47 || 3 || 54 || 12.4 || 2.6 || 0.2 || 3.0 || align=center|
|-
|align="left" bgcolor="#FFFF99"|^ || align="center"|G/F || align="left"|La Salle || align="center"|7 || align="center"|– || 421 || 15,671 || 4,171 || 2,069 || 5,710 || 37.2 || 9.9 || 4.9 || 13.6 || align=center|
|-
|align="left"| || align="center"|F/C || align="left"|Roberto Clemente HS (IL) || align="center"|8 || align="center"|– || 570 || 16,989 || 4,503 || 1,133 || 6,961 || 29.8 || 7.9 || 2.0 || 12.2 || align=center|
|-
|align="left"| || align="center"|F || align="left"|Auburn Montgomery || align="center"|1 || align="center"| || 7 || 22 || 11 || 0 || 8 || 3.1 || 1.6 || 0.0 || 1.1 || align=center|
|-
|align="left"| || align="center"|F || align="left"|Utah || align="center"|1 || align="center"| || 53 || 382 || 89 || 24 || 157 || 7.2 || 1.7 || 0.5 || 3.0 || align=center|
|-
|align="left"| || align="center"|G/F || align="left"|Iowa State || align="center"|3 || align="center"|– || 119 || 2,144 || 352 || 133 || 888 || 18.0 || 3.0 || 1.1 || 7.5 || align=center|
|-
|align="left" bgcolor="#FBCEB1"|* || align="center"|F || align="left"|Michigan State || align="center"|9 || align="center"|– || 639 || 18,183 || 4,415 || 3,413 || 5,614 || 28.5 || 6.9 || 5.3 || 8.8 || align=center|
|-
|align="left"| || align="center"|G || align="left"|Michigan || align="center"|1 || align="center"| || 76 || 1,098 || 116 || 149 || 340 || 14.4 || 1.5 || 2.0 || 4.5 || align=center|
|-
|align="left"| || align="center"|F || align="left"|La Salle || align="center"|1 || align="center"| || 1 || 1 || 0 || 0 || 0 || 1.0 || 0.0 || 0.0 || 0.0 || align=center|
|-
|align="left"| || align="center"|F || align="left"|NC State || align="center"|1 || align="center"| || 40 || 1,324 || 297 || 122 || 435 || 33.1 || 7.4 || 3.1 || 10.9 || align=center|
|-
|align="left"| || align="center"|F || align="left"|Iowa || align="center"|1 || align="center"| || 1 || 5 || 3 || 3 || 2 || 5.0 || 3.0 || 3.0 || 2.0 || align=center|
|-
|align="left"| || align="center"|G/F || align="left"|Saint Joseph's || align="center"|1 || align="center"| || 16 ||  ||  || 10 || 17 ||  ||  || 0.6 || 1.1 || align=center|
|-
|align="left"| || align="center"|F || align="left"|Saint Joseph's || align="center"|1 || align="center"| || 47 ||  ||  || 9 || 82 ||  ||  || 0.2 || 1.7 || align=center|
|-
|align="left"| || align="center"|G || align="left"|Indiana || align="center"|1 || align="center"| || 2 || 9 || 0 || 2 || 0 || 4.5 || 0.0 || 1.0 || 0.0 || align=center|
|}

H

|-
|align="left"| || align="center"|C || align="left"|West Texas A&M || align="center"|1 || align="center"| || 40 ||  ||  || 30 || 421 ||  ||  || 0.8 || 10.5 || align=center|
|-
|align="left"| || align="center"|C || align="left"|LSU || align="center"|1 || align="center"| || 3 || 10 || 1 || 0 || 4 || 3.3 || 0.3 || 0.0 || 1.3 || align=center|
|-
|align="left" bgcolor="#FFCC00"|+ || align="center"|G || align="left"|UTEP || align="center"|6 || align="center"|–– || 422 || 15,627 || 1,536 || 3,926 || 8,337 || 37.0 || 3.6 || bgcolor="#CFECEC"|9.3 || 19.8 || align=center|
|-
|align="left"| || align="center"|F || align="left"|St. Patrick HS (NJ) || align="center"|3 || align="center"|– || 128 || 3,711 || 737 || 240 || 1,877 || 29.0 || 5.8 || 1.9 || 14.7 || align=center|
|-
|align="left"| || align="center"|G || align="left"|Tulsa || align="center"|1 || align="center"| || 44 || 885 || 105 || 70 || 452 || 20.1 || 2.4 || 1.6 || 10.3 || align=center|
|-
|align="left"| || align="center"|G || align="left"|Providence || align="center"|3 || align="center"|– || 98 || 1,360 || 107 || 181 || 647 || 13.9 || 1.1 || 1.8 || 6.6 || align=center|
|-
|align="left"| || align="center"|G || align="left"|Kentucky || align="center"|3 || align="center"|– || 163 || 2,111 || 348 || 181 || 756 || 13.0 || 2.1 || 1.1 || 4.6 || align=center|
|-
|align="left"| || align="center"|G || align="left"|Illinois State || align="center"|1 || align="center"| || 32 || 153 || 30 || 16 || 126 || 4.8 || 0.9 || 0.5 || 3.9 || align=center|
|-
|align="left"| || align="center"|G || align="left"|UCLA || align="center"|1 || align="center"| || 46 || 629 || 78 || 112 || 208 || 13.7 || 1.7 || 2.4 || 4.5 || align=center|
|-
|align="left"| || align="center"|F || align="left"|Memphis || align="center"|1 || align="center"| || 12 || 70 || 3 || 4 || 36 || 5.8 || 0.3 || 0.3 || 3.0 || align=center|
|-
|align="left"| || align="center"|G || align="left"|Cal State Fullerton || align="center"|2 || align="center"|– || 17 || 215 || 20 || 32 || 56 || 12.6 || 1.2 || 1.9 || 3.3 || align=center|
|-
|align="left"| || align="center"|G || align="left"|Villanova || align="center"|1 || align="center"| || 53 || 444 || 49 || 46 || 196 || 8.4 || 0.9 || 0.9 || 3.7 || align=center|
|-
|align="left"| || align="center"|F/C || align="left"|Davidson || align="center"|3 || align="center"|– || 210 || 5,239 || 1,475 || 269 || 2,782 || 24.9 || 7.0 || 1.3 || 13.2 || align=center|
|-
|align="left"| || align="center"|F || align="left"|Fresno State || align="center"|7 || align="center"|– || 416 || 10,170 || 1,774 || 711 || 4,491 || 24.4 || 4.3 || 1.7 || 10.8 || align=center|
|-
|align="left"| || align="center"|G/F || align="left"|Michigan || align="center"|1 || align="center"| || 29 || 591 || 68 || 66 || 240 || 20.4 || 2.3 || 2.3 || 8.3 || align=center|
|-
|align="left"| || align="center"|F/C || align="left"|Kansas || align="center"|3 || align="center"|– || 193 || 4,960 || 1,167 || 222 || 1,940 || 25.7 || 6.0 || 1.2 || 10.1 || align=center|
|-
|align="left"| || align="center"|G || align="left"|Oklahoma City || align="center"|2 || align="center"|– || 76 || 1,103 || 129 || 109 || 370 || 14.5 || 1.7 || 1.4 || 4.9 || align=center|
|-
|align="left"| || align="center"|F || align="left"|Xavier || align="center"|3 || align="center"|– || 230 || 5,148 || 1,730 || 134 || 1,701 || 22.4 || 7.5 || 0.6 || 7.4 || align=center|
|-
|align="left"| || align="center"|C || align="left"|LIU Brooklyn || align="center"|2 || align="center"|– || 71 ||  ||  || 44 || 418 ||   ||   || 0.6 || 5.9 || align=center|
|-
|align="left"| || align="center"|F/C || align="left"|San Jose State || align="center"|1 || align="center"| || 49 || 708 || 180 || 47 || 198 || 14.4 || 3.7 || 1.0 || 4.0 || align=center|
|-
|align="left"| || align="center"|F/C || align="left"|Kansas State || align="center"|1 || align="center"| || 38 || 577 || 134 || 25 || 140 || 15.2 || 3.5 || 0.7 || 3.7 || align=center|
|-
|align="left"| || align="center"|G/F || align="left"|Purdue || align="center"|1 || align="center"| ||  ||  ||  ||  ||  ||  ||  ||  ||  || align=center|
|-
|align="left"| || align="center"|F || align="left"|Washington || align="center"|1 || align="center"| || 59 || 657 || 73 || 48 || 254 || 11.1 || 1.2 || 0.8 || 4.3 || align=center|
|-
|align="left"| || align="center"|F/C || align="left"|Nebraska || align="center"|1 || align="center"| || 36 || 607 || 167 || 30 || 211 || 16.9 || 4.6 || 0.8 || 5.9 || align=center|
|-
|align="left"| || align="center"|F || align="left"|Oklahoma State || align="center"|2 || align="center"|– || 150 || 2,140 || 509 || 101 || 617 || 14.3 || 3.4 || 0.7 || 4.1 || align=center|
|-
|align="left"| || align="center"|G || align="left"|Southern Illinois || align="center"|1 || align="center"| || 9 || 93 || 7 || 9 || 28 || 10.3 || 0.8 || 1.0 || 3.1 || align=center|
|-
|align="left"| || align="center"|G || align="left"|Saint Louis || align="center"|3 || align="center"|– || 155 || 5,201 || 711 || 669 || 2,443 || 33.6 || 4.6 || 4.3 || 15.8 || align=center|
|-
|align="left"| || align="center"|F || align="left"|Michigan || align="center"|1 || align="center"| || 60 || 783 || 167 || 37 || 270 || 13.1 || 2.8 || 0.6 || 4.5 || align=center|
|-
|align="left"| || align="center"|G || align="left"|Texas Tech || align="center"|1 || align="center"| || 82 || 1,208 || 65 || 342 || 345 || 14.7 || 0.8 || 4.2 || 4.2 || align=center|
|}

I to J

|-
|align="left"| || align="center"|G/F || align="left"|Arizona || align="center"|6 || align="center"|– || 413 || 11,039 || 1,615 || 1,397 || 2,996 || 26.7 || 3.9 || 3.4 || 7.3 || align=center|
|-
|align="left"| || align="center"|G || align="left"|Georgia Tech || align="center"|1 || align="center"| || 79 || 2,349 || 243 || 439 || 1,023 || 29.7 || 3.1 || 5.6 || 12.9 || align=center|
|-
|align="left"| || align="center"|G/F || align="left"|Georgetown || align="center"|1 || align="center"| || 5 || 54 || 10 || 3 || 26 || 10.8 || 2.0 || 0.6 || 5.2 || align=center|
|-
|align="left"| || align="center"|G || align="left"|Ohio State || align="center"|1 || align="center"| || 31 || 1,258 || 173 || 158 || 585 || 40.6 || 5.6 || 5.1 || 18.9 || align=center|
|-
|align="left"| || align="center"|C || align="left"|Temple || align="center"|2 || align="center"|– || 65 || 1,579 || 404 || 66 || 717 || 24.3 || 6.2 || 1.0 || 11.0 || align=center|
|-
|align="left"| || align="center"|G/F || align="left"|Butler CC || align="center"|4 || align="center"|– || 179 || 6,787 || 783 || 896 || 3,478 || 37.9 || 4.4 || 5.0 || 19.4 || align=center|
|-
|align="left"| || align="center"|G/F || align="left"|Minnesota || align="center"|1 || align="center"| || 49 || 663 || 70 || 30 || 245 || 13.5 || 1.4 || 0.6 || 5.0 || align=center|
|-
|align="left"| || align="center"|F || align="left"|North Carolina || align="center"|5 || align="center"|– || 336 || 12,267 || 2,509 || 605 || 6,775 || 36.5 || 7.5 || 1.8 || 20.2 || align=center|
|-
|align="left"| || align="center"|G || align="left"|Maryland || align="center"|1 || align="center"| || 26 || 309 || 21 || 61 || 113 || 11.9 || 0.8 || 2.3 || 4.3 || align=center|
|-
|align="left"| || align="center"|F || align="left"|Arizona || align="center"|2 || align="center"|– || 78 || 1,148 || 160 || 64 || 375 || 14.7 || 2.1 || 0.8 || 4.8 || align=center|
|-
|align="left"| || align="center"|G || align="left"|Hofstra || align="center"|2 || align="center"|– || 98 || 1,184 || 89 || 198 || 378 || 12.1 || 0.9 || 2.0 || 3.9 || align=center|
|-
|align="left"| || align="center"|G || align="left"|East Tennessee State || align="center"|3 || align="center"|– || 164 || 2,955 || 248 || 614 || 1,090 || 18.0 || 1.5 || 3.7 || 6.6 || align=center|
|-
|align="left"| || align="center"|C || align="left"|Iowa || align="center"|1 || align="center"| || 21 || 105 || 37 || 1 || 28 || 5.0 || 1.8 || 0.0 || 1.3 || align=center|
|-
|align="left"| || align="center"|F || align="left"|Sweden || align="center"|1 || align="center"| || 73 || 1,218 || 288 || 96 || 459 || 16.7 || 3.9 || 1.3 || 6.3 || align=center|
|-
|align="left"| || align="center"|G/F || align="left"|Portland || align="center"|3 || align="center"|– || 221 || 4,579 || 839 || 447 || 1,833 || 20.7 || 3.8 || 2.0 || 8.3 || align=center|
|-
|align="left"| || align="center"|G || align="left"|Southern || align="center"|2 || align="center"| || 128 || 2,969 || 209 || 544 || 1,102 || 23.2 || 1.6 || 4.3 || 8.6 || align=center|
|-
|align="left"| || align="center"|G || align="left"|California || align="center"|6 || align="center"|– || 400 || 7,346 || 1,023 || 714 || 3,166 || 18.4 || 2.6 || 1.8 || 7.9 || align=center|
|-
|align="left"| || align="center"|C || align="left"|Stephen F. Austin || align="center"|5 || align="center"|– || 325 || 5,421 || 2,072 || 256 || 1,429 || 16.7 || 6.4 || 0.8 || 4.4 || align=center|
|-
|align="left"| || align="center"|G/F || align="left"|Wichita State || align="center"|1 || align="center"| || 9 || 53 || 14 || 2 || 27 || 5.9 || 1.6 || 0.2 || 3.0 || align=center|
|-
|align="left"| || align="center"|G/F || align="left"|UCLA || align="center"|1 || align="center"| || 10 || 99 || 17 || 9 || 40 || 9.9 || 1.7 || 0.9 || 4.0 || align=center|
|-
|align="left"| || align="center"|F || align="left"|Aurora || align="center"|3 || align="center"|– || 174 || 4,586 || 1,159 || 468 || 2,403 || 26.4 || 6.7 || 2.7 || 13.8 || align=center|
|-
|align="left"| || align="center"|F/C || align="left"|Oregon State || align="center"|1 || align="center"| || 24 || 228 || 57 || 17 || 90 || 9.5 || 2.4 || 0.7 || 3.8 || align=center|
|-
|align="left" bgcolor="#FFFF99"|^ || align="center"|C || align="left"|Ohio State || align="center"|8 || align="center"|– || 516 || 18,298 || 5,856 || 1,269 || 10,023 || 35.5 || 11.3 || 2.5 || 19.4 || align=center|
|-
|align="left"| || align="center"|F/C || align="left"|Vanderbilt || align="center"|3 || align="center"|– || 49 || 584 || 112 || 30 || 174 || 11.9 || 2.3 || 0.6 || 3.6 || align=center|
|-
|align="left"| || align="center"|G || align="left"|Houston || align="center"|1 || align="center"| || 13 || 196 || 16 || 39 || 68 || 15.1 || 1.2 || 3.0 || 5.2 || align=center|
|-
|align="left"| || align="center"|G || align="left"|Oregon || align="center"|2 || align="center"|– || 146 || 1,661 || 149 || 158 || 776 || 11.4 || 1.0 || 1.1 || 5.3 || align=center|
|-
|align="left"| || align="center"|F || align="left"|Murray State || align="center"|1 || align="center"| || 5 || 10 || 1 || 0 || 0 || 2.0 || 0.2 || 0.0 || 0.0 || align=center|
|-
|align="left"| || align="center"|F || align="left"|St. John's || align="center"|1 || align="center"| || 2 || 13 || 2 || 2 || 6 || 6.5 || 1.0 || 1.0 || 3.0 || align=center|
|}

K to L

|-
|align="left"| || align="center"|G/F || align="left"|NYU || align="center"|2 || align="center"|– || 78 ||  ||  || 32 || 398 ||  ||  || 0.4 || 5.1 || align=center|
|-
|align="left"| || align="center"|G || align="left"|Boise State || align="center"|1 || align="center"| || 4 || 108 || 16 || 15 || 28 || 27.0 || 4.0 || 3.8 || 7.0 || align=center|
|-
|align="left"| || align="center"|G || align="left"|Princeton || align="center"|1 || align="center"| || 6 || 25 || 3 || 5 || 1 || 4.2 || 0.5 || 0.8 || 0.2 || align=center|
|-
|align="left"| || align="center"|F || align="left"|Stanford || align="center"|1 || align="center"| || 67 || 836 || 209 || 36 || 168 || 12.5 || 3.1 || 0.5 || 2.5 || align=center|
|-
|align="left"| || align="center"|F || align="left"|Purdue || align="center"|1 || align="center"| || 24 || 121 || 36 || 6 || 80 || 5.0 || 1.5 || 0.3 || 3.3 || align=center|
|-
|align="left"| || align="center"|G || align="left"|Temple || align="center"|1 || align="center"| || 7 || 52 || 8 || 9 || 12 || 7.4 || 1.1 || 1.3 || 1.7 || align=center|
|-
|align="left"| || align="center"|F || align="left"|Memphis || align="center"|1 || align="center"| || 11 || 121 || 26 || 5 || 41 || 11.0 || 2.4 || 0.5 || 3.7 || align=center|
|-
|align="left"| || align="center"|F || align="left"|Longwood || align="center"|1 || align="center"| || 76 || 1,620 || 363 || 114 || 510 || 21.3 || 4.8 || 1.5 || 6.7 || align=center|
|-
|align="left" bgcolor="#FFFF99"|^ || align="center"|F || align="left"|Tennessee || align="center"|2 || align="center"|– || 160 || 5,775 || 1,020 || 569 || 3,604 || 36.1 || 6.4 || 3.6 || 22.5 || align=center|
|-
|align="left" bgcolor="#FFCC00"|+ || align="center"|G || align="left"|Tulsa || align="center"|4 || align="center"|– || 170 || 4,525 || 698 || 599 || 2,044 || 26.6 || 4.1 || 3.5 || 12.0 || align=center|
|-
|align="left"| || align="center"|G || align="left"|Nebraska-Kearney || align="center"|1 || align="center"| || 5 || 21 || 3 || 4 || 3 || 4.2 || 0.6 || 0.8 || 0.6 || align=center|
|-
|align="left"| || align="center"|G || align="left"|Oklahoma City || align="center"|1 || align="center"| || 54 || 631 || 61 || 43 || 247 || 11.7 || 1.1 || 0.8 || 4.6 || align=center|
|-
|align="left"| || align="center"|G/F || align="left"|NYU || align="center"|1 || align="center"| || 33 || 276 || 59 || 26 || 102 || 8.4 || 1.8 || 0.8 || 3.1 || align=center|
|-
|align="left"| || align="center"|G/F || align="left"|Saint Mary's || align="center"|1 || align="center"| || 20 || 340 || 45 || 41 || 83 || 17.0 || 2.3 || 2.1 || 4.2 || align=center|
|-
|align="left"| || align="center"|F || align="left"|Notre Dame || align="center"|1 || align="center"| || 40 || 442 || 81 || 20 || 157 || 11.1 || 2.0 || 0.5 || 3.9 || align=center|
|-
|align="left"| || align="center"|C || align="left"|Serbia || align="center"|2 || align="center"|– || 37 || 164 || 38 || 8 || 35 || 4.4 || 1.0 || 0.2 || 0.9 || align=center|
|-
|align="left"| || align="center"|G/F || align="left"|San Francisco || align="center"|1 || align="center"| || 16 || 171 || 24 || 19 || 65 || 10.7 || 1.5 || 1.2 || 4.1 || align=center|
|-
|align="left"| || align="center"|F || align="left"|California || align="center"|1 || align="center"| || 10 || 63 || 11 || 2 || 34 || 6.3 || 1.1 || 0.2 || 3.4 || align=center|
|-
|align="left"| || align="center"|F || align="left"|Purdue || align="center"|1 || align="center"| || 81 || 1,876 || 483 || 65 || 874 || 23.2 || 6.0 || 0.8 || 10.8 || align=center|
|-
|align="left"| || align="center"|F || align="left"|Vanderbilt || align="center"|1 || align="center"| || 4 || 17 || 3 || 0 || 6 || 4.3 || 0.8 || 0.0 || 1.5 || align=center|
|-
|align="left"| || align="center"|G || align="left"|North Carolina || align="center"|1 || align="center"| || 51 || 646 || 71 || 85 || 277 || 12.7 || 1.4 || 1.7 || 5.4 || align=center|
|-
|align="left"| || align="center"|G || align="left"|Wake Forest || align="center"|1 || align="center"| || 4 || 22 || 3 || 2 || 4 || 5.5 || 0.8 || 0.5 || 1.0 || align=center|
|-
|align="left" bgcolor="#FFCC00"|+ || align="center"|F/C || align="left"|Dartmouth || align="center"|2 || align="center"|– || 154 || 5,601 || 1,365 || 341 || 3,276 || 36.4 || 8.9 || 2.2 || 21.3 || align=center|
|-
|align="left"| || align="center"|F || align="left"|UMass || align="center"|1 || align="center"| || 1 || 0 || 0 || 0 || 0 || 0.0 || 0.0 || 0.0 || 0.0 || align=center|
|-
|align="left"| || align="center"|F/C || align="left"|UTEP || align="center"|1 || align="center"| || 44 || 257 || 104 || 14 || 97 || 5.8 || 2.4 || 0.3 || 2.2 || align=center|
|-
|align="left"| || align="center"|G || align="left"|Texas A&M || align="center"|2 || align="center"|– || 45 || 698 || 54 || 77 || 234 || 15.5 || 1.2 || 1.7 || 5.2 || align=center|
|-
|align="left"| || align="center"|G || align="left"|Temple || align="center"|1 || align="center"| || 3 || 14 || 1 || 1 || 4 || 4.7 || 0.3 || 0.3 || 1.3 || align=center|
|-
|align="left" bgcolor="#FFCC00"|+ || align="center"|F/C || align="left"|Vanderbilt || align="center"|8 || align="center"|– || 583 || 16,008 || 6,416 || 624 || 4,953 || 27.5 || 11.0 || 1.1 || 8.5 || align=center|
|-
|align="left" bgcolor="#CCFFCC"|x || align="center"|G || align="left"|Louisville || align="center"|3 || align="center"|– || 138 || 2,877 || 483 || 219 || 1,152 || 20.8 || 3.5 || 1.6 || 8.3 || align=center|
|-
|align="left" bgcolor="#FFCC00"|+ || align="center"|F || align="left"|Florida || align="center"|5 || align="center"|– || 327 || 10,854 || 3,045 || 906 || 5,454 || 33.2 || 9.3 || 2.8 || 16.7 || align=center|
|-
|align="left"| || align="center"|G/F || align="left"|Michigan || align="center"|5 || align="center"|–– || 148 || 2,072 || 396 || 105 || 762 || 14.0 || 2.7 || 0.7 || 5.1 || align=center|
|-
|align="left"| || align="center"|G || align="left"|La Salle || align="center"|2 || align="center"||| 47 || 655 || 63 || 51 || 253 || 13.9 || 1.3 || 1.1 || 5.4 || align=center|
|-
|align="left"| || align="center"|G || align="left"|North Carolina || align="center"|3 || align="center"|– || 176 || 2,451 || 327 || 311 || 1,014 || 13.9 || 1.9 || 1.8 || 5.8 || align=center|
|-
|align="left"| || align="center"|G/F || align="left"|Eastern Kentucky || align="center"|1 || align="center"| || 16 ||  ||  || 7 || 54 ||  ||  || 0.4 || 3.4 || align=center|
|-
|align="left"| || align="center"|G/F || align="left"|Stanford || align="center"|1 || align="center"| || 5 || 58 || 10 || 3 || 31 || 11.6 || 2.0 || 0.6 || 6.2 || align=center|
|-
|align="left"| || align="center"|G || align="left"|Harvard || align="center"|1 || align="center"| || 29 || 285 || 34 || 42 || 76 || 9.8 || 1.2 || 1.4 || 2.6 || align=center|
|-
|align="left"| || align="center"|F/C || align="left"|Arizona State || align="center"|4 || align="center"|– || 126 || 2,059 || 627 || 114 || 650 || 16.3 || 5.0 || 0.9 || 5.2 || align=center|
|-
|align="left"| || align="center"|G || align="left"|LSU || align="center"|1 || align="center"| || 2 || 7 || 1 || 1 || 0 || 3.5 || 0.5 || 0.5 || 0.0 || align=center|
|-
|align="left"| || align="center"|G || align="left"|Peoria HS (IL) || align="center"|5 || align="center"|– || 367 || 6,429 || 751 || 889 || 1,990 || 17.5 || 2.0 || 2.4 || 5.4 || align=center|
|-
|align="left"| || align="center"|C || align="left"|Wyoming || align="center"|2 || align="center"|– || 101 ||  || 297 || 193 || 647 || 0.0 || 4.7 || 1.9 || 6.4 || align=center|
|-
|align="left"| || align="center"|G/F || align="left"|Drake || align="center"|2 || align="center"|– || 89 || 1,445 || 276 || 136 || 744 || 16.2 || 3.1 || 1.5 || 8.4 || align=center|
|-
|align="left"| || align="center"|F/C || align="left"|San Francisco || align="center"|1 || align="center"| || 64 || 1,788 || 339 || 106 || 472 || 27.9 || 5.3 || 1.7 || 7.4 || align=center|
|-
|align="left" bgcolor="#CCFFCC"|x || align="center"|F/C || align="left"|UCLA || align="center"|6 || align="center"|– || 285 || 4,282 || 1,154 || 333 || 1,230 || 15.0 || 4.0 || 1.2 || 4.3 || align=center|
|-
|align="left"| || align="center"|G || align="left"|Jackson State || align="center"|1 || align="center"| || 37 || 672 || 71 || 101 || 272 || 18.2 || 1.9 || 2.7 || 7.4 || align=center|
|-
|align="left" bgcolor="#FFFF99"|^ || align="center"|F/C || align="left"|Ohio State || align="center"|2 || align="center"|– || 143 || 5,553 || 2,171 || 459 || 2,504 || 38.8 || 15.2 || 3.2 || 17.5 || align=center|
|-
|align="left"| || align="center"|G || align="left"|Maryland || align="center"|3 || align="center"|– || 228 || 7,777 || 621 || 1,828 || 2,889 || 34.1 || 2.7 || 8.0 || 12.7 || align=center|
|-
|align="left"| || align="center"|F || align="left"|Houston || align="center"|2 || align="center"|– || 87 || 597 || 166 || 35 || 196 || 6.9 || 1.9 || 0.4 || 2.3 || align=center|
|}

M

|-
|align="left"| || align="center"|G/F || align="left"|Houston || align="center"|1 || align="center"| || 23 || 333 || 39 || 24 || 114 || 14.5 || 1.7 || 1.0 || 5.0 || align=center|
|-
|align="left"| || align="center"|G || align="left"|UCLA || align="center"|1 || align="center"| || 19 || 243 || 15 || 45 || 37 || 12.8 || 0.8 || 2.4 || 1.9 || align=center|
|-
|align="left"| || align="center"|F || align="left"|Duke || align="center"|2 || align="center"|– || 121 || 3,669 || 655 || 264 || 2,337 || 30.3 || 5.4 || 2.2 || 19.3 || align=center|
|-
|align="left"| || align="center"|F || align="left"|Fresno State || align="center"|1 || align="center"| || 1 || 27 || 2 || 0 || 5 || 27.0 || 2.0 || 0.0 || 5.0 || align=center|
|-
|align="left" bgcolor="#CCFFCC"|x || align="center"|G || align="left"|Arizona || align="center"|1 || align="center"| || 30 || 364 || 46 || 70 || 123 || 12.1 || 1.5 || 2.3 || 4.1 || align=center|
|-
|align="left"| || align="center"|G || align="left"|Utah || align="center"|1 || align="center"| || 57 || 469 || 59 || 47 || 121 || 8.2 || 1.0 || 0.8 || 2.1 || align=center|
|-
|align="left" bgcolor="#FFFF99"|^ || align="center"|G || align="left"|Soviet Union || align="center"|4 || align="center"|– || 227 || 5,635 || 644 || 554 || 3,332 || 24.8 || 2.8 || 2.4 || 14.7 || align=center|
|-
|align="left"| || align="center"|G || align="left"|Manhattan || align="center"|1 || align="center"| || 60 || 851 || 75 || 90 || 269 || 14.2 || 1.3 || 1.5 || 4.5 || align=center|
|-
|align="left"| || align="center"|F || align="left"|UConn || align="center"|6 || align="center"|– || 340 || 8,938 || 2,305 || 543 || 3,824 || 26.3 || 6.8 || 1.6 || 11.2 || align=center|
|-
|align="left"| || align="center"|F || align="left"|Kansas State || align="center"|1 || align="center"| || 10 || 276 || 47 || 9 || 90 || 27.6 || 4.7 || 0.9 || 9.0 || align=center|
|-
|align="left"| || align="center"|F || align="left"|Maryland || align="center"|1 || align="center"| || 7 || 22 || 12 || 0 || 16 || 3.1 || 1.7 || 0.0 || 2.3 || align=center|
|-
|align="left"| || align="center"|F || align="left"|Iowa || align="center"|1 || align="center"| || 7 || 54 || 9 || 1 || 17 || 7.7 || 1.3 || 0.1 || 2.4 || align=center|
|-
|align="left"| || align="center"|C || align="left"|DR Congo || align="center"|1 || align="center"| || 16 || 130 || 31 || 4 || 19 || 8.1 || 1.9 || 0.3 || 1.2 || align=center|
|-
|align="left"| || align="center"|F || align="left"|North Carolina || align="center"|3 || align="center"|– || 108 || 856 || 186 || 37 || 326 || 7.9 || 1.7 || 0.3 || 3.0 || align=center|
|-
|align="left"| || align="center"|G || align="left"|UNLV || align="center"|2 || align="center"|– || 128 || 2,035 || 182 || 158 || 511 || 15.9 || 1.4 || 1.2 || 4.0 || align=center|
|-
|align="left"| || align="center"|G || align="left"|Penn || align="center"|1 || align="center"| || 1 || 16 || 3 || 1 || 6 || 16.0 || 3.0 || 1.0 || 6.0 || align=center|
|-
|align="left"| || align="center"|F || align="left"|UC Irvine || align="center"|3 || align="center"|– || 155 || 3,426 || 530 || 227 || 1,000 || 22.1 || 3.4 || 1.5 || 6.5 || align=center|
|-
|align="left"| || align="center"|F/C || align="left"|Memphis || align="center"|2 || align="center"|– || 44 || 465 || 130 || 24 || 135 || 10.6 || 3.0 || 0.5 || 3.1 || align=center|
|-
|align="left"| || align="center"|C || align="left"|Nevada || align="center"|2 || align="center"|– || 142 || 1,354 || 413 || 50 || 782 || 9.5 || 2.9 || 0.4 || 5.5 || align=center|
|-
|align="left"| || align="center"|F || align="left"|Fresno State || align="center"|1 || align="center"| || 64 || 1,127 || 246 || 110 || 227 || 17.6 || 3.8 || 1.7 || 3.5 || align=center|
|-
|align="left"| || align="center"|F || align="left"|Green Bay || align="center"|1 || align="center"| || 72 || 1,003 || 247 || 31 || 337 || 13.9 || 3.4 || 0.4 || 4.7 || align=center|
|-
|align="left"| || align="center"|F/C || align="left"|Drake || align="center"|2 || align="center"|– || 158 || 3,198 || 976 || 136 || 1,237 || 20.2 || 6.2 || 0.9 || 7.8 || align=center|
|-
|align="left"| || align="center"|G || align="left"|Bowling Green || align="center"|1 || align="center"| || 26 || 379 || 21 || 45 || 138 || 14.6 || 0.8 || 1.7 || 5.3 || align=center|
|-
|align="left"| || align="center"|G || align="left"|Saint Joseph's || align="center"|1 || align="center"| || 21 || 212 || 33 || 49 || 86 || 10.1 || 1.6 || 2.3 || 4.1 || align=center|
|-
|align="left"| || align="center"|F/C || align="left"|Marquette || align="center"|2 || align="center"|– || 25 || 204 || 63 || 5 || 113 || 8.2 || 2.5 || 0.2 || 4.5 || align=center|
|-
|align="left"| || align="center"|G || align="left"|DePaul || align="center"|1 || align="center"| || 22 || 287 || 31 || 22 || 150 || 13.0 || 1.4 || 1.0 || 6.8 || align=center|
|-
|align="left"| || align="center"|G || align="left"|Auburn || align="center"|1 || align="center"| || 2 || 11 || 0 || 2 || 0 || 5.5 || 0.0 || 1.0 || 0.0 || align=center|
|-
|align="left" bgcolor="#FFCC00"|+ (#14) || align="center"|F || align="left"|Saint Mary's || align="center"|6 || align="center"|– || 455 || 13,813 || 3,885 || 679 || 5,854 || 30.4 || 8.5 || 1.5 || 12.9 || align=center|
|-
|align="left"| || align="center"|F/C || align="left"|DePaul || align="center"|3 || align="center"|– || 118 || 2,139 || 611 || 134 || 945 || 25.2 || 7.2 || 1.1 || 8.0 || align=center|
|-
|align="left"| || align="center"|G || align="left"|Kansas || align="center"|1 || align="center"| || 19 || 118 || 14 || 24 || 16 || 6.2 || 0.7 || 1.3 || 0.8 || align=center|
|-
|align="left"| || align="center"|F || align="left"|Arizona || align="center"|5 || align="center"|– || 169 || 4,036 || 693 || 262 || 1,575 || 23.9 || 4.1 || 1.6 || 9.3 || align=center|
|-
|align="left"| || align="center"|G || align="left"|Kentucky || align="center"|1 || align="center"| || 11 || 202 || 21 || 38 || 65 || 18.4 || 1.9 || 3.5 || 5.9 || align=center|
|-
|align="left"| || align="center"|F || align="left"|Temple || align="center"|1 || align="center"| || 31 || 608 || 101 || 62 || 181 || 19.6 || 3.3 || 2.0 || 5.8 || align=center|
|-
|align="left"| || align="center"|F/C || align="left"|Youngstown State || align="center"|2 || align="center"|– || 121 ||  || 102 || 131 || 701 ||  || 1.8 || 1.1 || 5.8 || align=center|
|-
|align="left"| || align="center"|F/C || align="left"|Kansas || align="center"|1 || align="center"| || 36 || 257 || 67 || 9 || 57 || 7.1 || 1.9 || 0.3 || 1.6 || align=center|
|-
|align="left"| || align="center"|F || align="left"|UTPA || align="center"|1 || align="center"| || 20 || 364 || 69 || 21 || 144 || 18.2 || 3.5 || 1.1 || 7.2 || align=center|
|-
|align="left"| || align="center"|F || align="left"|Villanova || align="center"|1 || align="center"| || 18 || 529 || 70 || 35 || 135 || 29.4 || 3.9 || 1.9 || 7.5 || align=center|
|-
|align="left"| || align="center"|F || align="left"|La Salle || align="center"|3 || align="center"|– || 111 || 802 || 233 || 47 || 255 || 7.2 || 2.1 || 0.4 || 2.3 || align=center|
|-
|align="left"| || align="center"|F/C || align="left"|Nebraska || align="center"|2 || align="center"| || 30 || 524 || 91 || 41 || 139 || 17.5 || 3.0 || 1.4 || 4.6 || align=center|
|-
|align="left"| || align="center"|C || align="left"|Boston College || align="center"|1 || align="center"| || 20 ||  ||  || 7 || 42 ||  ||  || 0.4 || 2.1 || align=center|
|-
|align="left"| || align="center"|G || align="left"|Georgia Tech || align="center"|2 || align="center"|– || 136 || 3,533 || 458 || 184 || 1,575 || 26.0 || 3.4 || 1.4 || 11.6 || align=center|
|-
|align="left"| || align="center"|F || align="left"|Louisville || align="center"|1 || align="center"| || 41 || 395 || 58 || 18 || 167 || 9.6 || 1.4 || 0.4 || 4.1 || align=center|
|-
|align="left"| || align="center"|G || align="left"|Northeastern || align="center"|1 || align="center"| || 64 || 698 || 95 || 90 || 232 || 10.9 || 1.5 || 1.4 || 3.6 || align=center|
|-
|align="left" bgcolor="#CCFFCC"|x || align="center"|G || align="left"|Kentucky || align="center"|2 || align="center"|– || 67 || 970 || 83 || 34 || 414 || 14.5 || 1.2 || .5 || 6.2 || align=center|
|-
|align="left" bgcolor="#FFFF99"|^ (#17) || align="center"|G/F || align="left"|St. John's || align="center" bgcolor="#CFECEC"|13 || align="center"|– || bgcolor="#CFECEC"|807 || 28,225 || 3,549 || 3,146 || 16,235 || 35.0 || 4.4 || 3.9 || 20.1 || align=center|
|-
|align="left" bgcolor="#FFCC00"|+ || align="center"|G/F || align="left"|Duke || align="center"|10 || align="center"|– || 716 || 23,495 || 3,256 || 2,913 || 12,547 || 32.8 || 4.5 || 4.1 || 17.5 || align=center|
|-
|align="left"| || align="center"|F || align="left"|Simon Gratz HS (PA) || align="center"|1 || align="center"| || 11 ||  ||  || 0 || 8 ||  ||  ||  || 0.7 || align=center|
|-
|align="left"| || align="center"|F/C || align="left"|UC Irvine || align="center"|1 || align="center"| || 2 || 10 || 1 || 1 || 0 || 5.0 || 0.5 || 0.5 || 0.0 || align=center|
|-
|align="left"| || align="center"|F/C || align="left"|Notre Dame || align="center"|6 || align="center"|– || 359 || 10,126 || 2,957 || 454 || 4,024 || 28.2 || 8.2 || 1.3 || 11.2 || align=center|
|-
|align="left"| || align="center"|G/F || align="left"|St. Bonaventure || align="center"|1 || align="center"| ||  ||  ||  ||  ||  ||  ||  ||  ||  || align=center|
|-
|align="left"| || align="center"|G || align="left"|Temple || align="center"|3 || align="center"|– || 161 ||  ||  || 117 || 1,359 ||  ||  || 0.7 || 8.4 || align=center|
|}

N to P

|-
|align="left"| || align="center"|F || align="left"|Oklahoma || align="center"|1 || align="center"| || 42 || 610 || 118 || 37 || 175 || 14.5 || 2.8 || 0.9 || 4.2 || align=center|
|-
|align="left"| || align="center"|F || align="left"|Kentucky || align="center"|1 || align="center"| || 20 || 190 || 48 || 9 || 84 || 9.5 || 2.4 || 0.5 || 4.2 || align=center|
|-
|align="left"| || align="center"|F/C || align="left"|UCLA || align="center"|1 || align="center"| || 47 || 1,225 || 315 || 58 || 518 || 26.1 || 6.7 || 1.2 || 11.0 || align=center|
|-
|align="left"| || align="center"|F || align="left"|Kansas State || align="center"|1 || align="center"| || 30 || 229 || 48 || 13 || 46 || 7.6 || 1.6 || 0.4 || 1.5 || align=center|
|-
|align="left"| || align="center"|G || align="left"|Serbia || align="center"|1 || align="center"| || 24 || 142 || 15 || 13 || 26 || 5.9 || 0.6 || 0.5 || 1.1 || align=center|
|-
|align="left"| || align="center"|G || align="left"|Duke || align="center"|1 || align="center"| || 13 || 171 || 24 || 13 || 53 || 13.2 || 1.8 || 1.0 || 4.1 || align=center|
|-
|align="left"| || align="center"|G || align="left"|Stanford || align="center"|3 || align="center"|– || 180 || 5,084 || 576 || 620 || 2,425 || 28.2 || 3.2 || 3.4 || 13.5 || align=center|
|-
|align="left"| || align="center"|C || align="left"|Georgia Tech || align="center"|1 || align="center"| || 5 ||  ||  || 4 || 8 ||  ||  || 0.8 || 1.6 || align=center|
|-
|align="left"| || align="center"|G || align="left"|Gonzaga || align="center"|1 || align="center"| || 3 || 36 || 5 || 3 || 10 || 12.0 || 1.7 || 1.0 || 3.3 || align=center|
|-
|align="left"| || align="center"|F/C || align="left"|Loyola (IL) || align="center"|1 || align="center"| || 55 ||  ||  || 57 || 96 ||  ||  || 1.0 || 1.7 || align=center|
|-
|align="left"| || align="center"|F || align="left"|Pepperdine || align="center"|2 || align="center"|– || 38 ||  ||  || 9 || 64 ||  ||  || 0.2 || 1.7 || align=center|
|-
|align="left"| || align="center"|C || align="left"|Bradley || align="center"|2 || align="center"|– || 40 || 218 || 50 || 13 || 66 || 5.5 || 1.3 || 0.3 || 1.7 || align=center|
|-
|align="left"| || align="center"|F || align="left"|Santa Clara || align="center"|1 || align="center"| || 32 || 162 || 32 || 9 || 42 || 5.1 || 1.0 || 0.3 || 1.3 || align=center|
|-
|align="left"| || align="center"|G || align="left"|Iowa || align="center"|2 || align="center"|– || 35 || 232 || 24 || 44 || 64 || 6.6 || 0.7 || 1.3 || 1.8 || align=center|
|-
|align="left"| || align="center"|F/C || align="left"|Louisville || align="center"|2 || align="center"|– || 95 || 914 || 282 || 50 || 367 || 9.6 || 3.0 || 0.5 || 3.9 || align=center|
|-
|align="left"| || align="center"|F/C || align="left"|Eau Claire HS (SC) || align="center"|1 || align="center"| || 44 || 883 || 242 || 25 || 349 || 20.1 || 5.5 || 0.6 || 7.9 || align=center|
|-
|align="left" bgcolor="#CCFFCC"|x || align="center"|G/F || align="left"|Kansas || align="center"|1 || align="center"| || 55 || 1,687 || 329 || 73 || 849 || 30.7 || 6.0 || 1.3 || 15.4 || align=center|
|-
|align="left"| || align="center"|G || align="left"|East Central || align="center"|1 || align="center"| || 15 || 182 || 25 || 15 || 58 || 12.1 || 1.7 || 1.0 || 3.9 || align=center|
|-
|align="left"| || align="center"|G/F || align="left"|Syracuse || align="center"|4 || align="center"|– || 212 || 6,835 || 1,652 || 696 || 3,042 || 32.2 || 7.8 || 3.3 || 14.3 || align=center|
|-
|align="left"| || align="center"|F || align="left"|Arizona || align="center"|1 || align="center"| || 57 || 592 || 163 || 15 || 177 || 10.4 || 2.9 || 0.3 || 3.1 || align=center|
|-
|align="left"| || align="center"|C || align="left"|Georgia || align="center"|2 || align="center"|– || 139 || 2,240 || 731 || 241 || 799 || 16.1 || 5.3 || 1.7 || 5.7 || align=center|
|-
|align="left"| || align="center"|G || align="left"|Gonzaga || align="center"|1 || align="center"| || 3 || 44 || 3 || 8 || 25 || 14.7 || 1.0 || 2.7 || 8.3 || align=center|
|-
|align="left"| || align="center"|G/F || align="left"|Texas Wesleyan || align="center"|1 || align="center"| || 7 ||  || 9 || 2 || 6 ||  || 1.3 || 0.3 || 0.9 || align=center|
|-
|align="left" bgcolor="#FFFF99"|^ || align="center"|C || align="left"|Centenary || align="center"|4 || align="center"|– || 307 || 7,883 || 2,922 || 406 || 4,249 || 25.7 || 9.5 || 1.3 || 13.8 || align=center|
|-
|align="left"| || align="center"|G/F || align="left"|Texas A&M || align="center"|6 || align="center"|– || 452 || 10,916 || 1,841 || 954 || 4,471 || 24.2 || 4.1 || 2.1 || 9.9 || align=center|
|-
|align="left"| || align="center"|F/C || align="left"|Duke || align="center"|1 || align="center"| || 12 || 64 || 10 || 1 || 12 || 5.3 || 0.8 || 0.1 || 1.0 || align=center|
|-
|align="left"| || align="center"|G || align="left"|Western Kentucky || align="center"|1 || align="center"| || 9 ||  ||  || 8 || 22 ||  ||  || 0.9 || 2.4 || align=center|
|-
|align="left" bgcolor="#CCFFCC"|x || align="center"|F || align="left"|Villanova || align="center"|2 || align="center"|– || 100 || 2,349 || 403 || 178 || 1,218 || 23.5 || 4.0 || 1.8 || 12.2 || align=center|
|-
|align="left"| || align="center"|G/F || align="left"|Bowling Green || align="center"|1 || align="center"| || 17 ||  ||  || 8 || 37 ||  ||  || 0.5 || 2.2 || align=center|
|-
|align="left" bgcolor="#CCFFCC"|x || align="center"|G || align="left"|Oregon State || align="center"|1 || align="center"| || 10 || 40 || 11 || 1 || 25 || 4.0 || 1.1 || 0.1 || 2.5 || align=center|
|-
|align="left"| || align="center"|G/F || align="left"|Tulane || align="center"|1 || align="center"| || 45 || 471 || 83 || 45 || 129 || 10.5 || 1.8 || 1.0 || 2.9 || align=center|
|-
|align="left"| || align="center"|C || align="left"|Serbia || align="center"|1 || align="center"| || 7 || 38 || 13 || 1 || 10 || 5.4 || 1.9 || 0.1 || 1.4 || align=center|
|-
|align="left"| || align="center"|F/C || align="left"|Minnesota || align="center"|3 || align="center"|– || 132 || 1,595 || 405 || 59 || 494 || 12.1 || 3.1 || 0.4 || 3.7 || align=center|
|-
|align="left"| || align="center"|G || align="left"|La Salle || align="center"|1 || align="center"| || 4 || 33 || 5 || 2 || 3 || 8.3 || 1.3 || 0.5 || 0.8 || align=center|
|-
|align="left" bgcolor="#FFFF99"|^ || align="center"|G/F || align="left"|Illinois || align="center"|3 || align="center"|– || 145 || 3,476 || 880 || 1,064 || 1,684 || 44.0 || 6.7 || 7.3 || 11.6 || align=center|
|-
|align="left"| || align="center"|G || align="left"|Houston || align="center"|4 || align="center"|– || 281 || 6,219 || 796 || 601 || 2,049 || 22.1 || 2.8 || 2.1 || 7.3 || align=center|
|-
|align="left"| || align="center"|G || align="left"|Rice || align="center"|1 || align="center"| || 27 || 673 || 64 || 40 || 338 || 24.9 || 2.4 || 1.5 || 12.5 || align=center|
|-
|align="left"| || align="center"|G/F || align="left"|France || align="center"|5 || align="center"|– || 310 || 6,520 || 1,040 || 264 || 2,669 || 21.0 || 3.4 || 0.9 || 8.6 || align=center|
|-
|align="left"| || align="center"|F/C || align="left"|Boston University || align="center"|1 || align="center"| || 66 || 702 || 134 || 26 || 250 || 10.6 || 2.0 || 0.4 || 3.8 || align=center|
|-
|align="left"| || align="center"|F/C || align="left"|Whitworth || align="center"|1 || align="center"| || 46 || 773 || 203 || 22 || 181 || 16.8 || 4.4 || 0.5 || 3.9 || align=center|
|-
|align="left" bgcolor="#CCFFCC"|x || align="center"|G || align="left"|Michigan || align="center"|2 || align="center"|– || 108 || 2,262 || 210 || 233 || 1,115 || 20.9 || 1.9 || 2.2 || 10.3 || align=center|
|-
|align="left"| || align="center"|F || align="left"|Auburn || align="center"|1 || align="center"| || 51 || 1,147 || 189 || 61 || 440 || 22.5 || 3.7 || 1.2 || 8.6 || align=center|
|-
|align="left"| || align="center"|F || align="left"|Creighton || align="center"|4 || align="center"|– || 221 || 2,937 || 729 || 128 || 1,254 || 13.3 || 3.3 || 0.6 || 5.7 || align=center|
|-
|align="left"| || align="center"|F || align="left"|NC State || align="center"|1 || align="center"| || 30 || 289 || 69 || 18 || 104 || 9.6 || 2.3 || 0.6 || 3.5 || align=center|
|-
|align="left"| || align="center"|G/F || align="left"|Tulsa || align="center"|1 || align="center"| || 18 || 268 || 31 || 30 || 79 || 14.9 || 1.7 || 1.7 || 4.4 || align=center|
|-
|align="left"| || align="center"|G || align="left"|Georgia Tech || align="center"|1 || align="center"| || 70 || 1,876 || 179 || 342 || 793 || 26.8 || 2.6 || 4.9 || 11.3 || align=center|
|-
|align="left"| || align="center"|G || align="left"|Kansas || align="center"|1 || align="center"| || 62 || 773 || 65 || 81 || 243 || 12.5 || 1.0 || 1.3 || 3.9 || align=center|
|-
|align="left"| || align="center"|F/C || align="left"|SMU || align="center"|1 || align="center"| || 13 ||  ||  || 6 || 20 ||  ||  || 0.5 || 1.5 || align=center|
|}

R

|-
|align="left"| || align="center"|F || align="left"|Serbia || align="center"|2 || align="center"|– || 107 || 1,927 || 361 || 117 || 591 || 18.0 || 3.4 || 1.1 || 5.5 || align=center|
|-
|align="left"| || align="center"|F || align="left"|Indiana || align="center"|1 || align="center"| || 37 || 175 || 51 || 4 || 87 || 4.7 || 1.4 || 0.1 || 2.4 || align=center|
|-
|align="left"| || align="center"|G || align="left"|Wyoming || align="center"|1 || align="center"| || 4 || 33 || 1 || 8 || 14 || 8.3 || 0.3 || 2.0 || 3.5 || align=center|
|-
|align="left"| || align="center"|F || align="left"|Saint Joseph's || align="center"|1 || align="center"| || 1 || 6 || 2 || 1 || 0 || 6.0 || 2.0 || 1.0 || 0.0 || align=center|
|-
|align="left"| || align="center"|G || align="left"|Stanford || align="center"|1 || align="center"| || 3 || 40 || 2 || 5 || 5 || 13.3 || 0.7 || 1.7 || 1.7 || align=center|
|-
|align="left"| || align="center"|F || align="left"|LSU || align="center"|2 || align="center"|– || 96 || 1,878 || 578 || 91 || 883 || 19.6 || 6.0 || 0.9 || 9.2 || align=center|
|-
|align="left"| || align="center"|C || align="left"|Oklahoma || align="center"|7 || align="center"|– || 549 || 13,427 || 4,310 || 957 || 3,871 || 24.5 || 7.9 || 1.7 || 7.1 || align=center|
|-
|align="left"| || align="center"|G || align="left"|San Francisco || align="center"|1 || align="center"| || 59 || 597 || 60 || 71 || 190 || 10.1 || 1.0 || 1.2 || 3.2 || align=center|
|-
|align="left"| || align="center"|G || align="left"|Michigan State || align="center"|6 || align="center"|– || 438 || 15,539 || 2,363 || 1,394 || 8,008 || 35.5 || 5.4 || 3.2 || 18.3 || align=center|
|-
|align="left"| || align="center"|G/F || align="left"|Montana || align="center"|1 || align="center"| || 33 || 1,074 || 145 || 245 || 411 || 32.5 || 4.4 || 7.4 || 12.5 || align=center|
|-
|align="left" bgcolor="#FFFF99"|^ || align="center"|G || align="left"|Kansas State || align="center"|3 || align="center"|– || 234 || 8,543 || 1,280 || 795 || 5,301 || 36.5 || 5.5 || 3.4 || 22.7 || align=center|
|-
|align="left"| || align="center"|G || align="left"|Florida || align="center"|1 || align="center"| || 20 || 227 || 21 || 10 || 111 || 11.4 || 1.1 || 0.5 || 5.6 || align=center|
|-
|align="left"| || align="center"|G || align="left"|West Virginia || align="center"|1 || align="center"| || 12 || 74 || 10 || 4 || 36 || 6.2 || 0.8 || 0.3 || 3.0 || align=center|
|-
|align="left"| || align="center"|F/C || align="left"|UConn || align="center"|2 || align="center"|– || 124 || 3,936 || 436 || 345 || 1,326 || 31.7 || 3.5 || 2.8 || 10.7 || align=center|
|-
|align="left"| || align="center"|G/F || align="left"|Michigan || align="center"|1 || align="center"| || 48 || 1,516 || 226 || 85 || 619 || 31.6 || 4.7 || 1.8 || 12.9 || align=center|
|-
|align="left"| || align="center"|G/F || align="left"|Centenary || align="center"|1 || align="center"| || 24 || 170 || 23 || 11 || 56 || 7.1 || 1.0 || 0.5 || 2.3 || align=center|
|-
|align="left"| || align="center"|G || align="left"|Washington || align="center"|1 || align="center"| || 51 || 1,192 || 100 || 231 || 570 || 23.4 || 2.0 || 4.5 || 11.2 || align=center|
|-
|align="left"| || align="center"|F/C || align="left"|California || align="center"|1 || align="center"| || 9 ||  ||  || 3 || 17 ||  ||  || 0.3 || 1.9 || align=center|
|-
|align="left" bgcolor="#FFFF99"|^ || align="center"|G || align="left"|Temple || align="center"|8 || align="center"|– || 587 || 21,148 || 2,995 || 4,855 || 7,516 || 36.0 || 5.1 || 8.3 || 12.8 || align=center|
|-
|align="left"| || align="center"|F || align="left"|UMass || align="center"|1 || align="center"| || 17 || 107 || 14 || 6 || 40 || 6.3 || 0.8 || 0.4 || 2.4 || align=center|
|-
|align="left"| || align="center"|F/C || align="left"|Tennessee State || align="center"|1 || align="center"| || 49 || 1,017 || 278 || 37 || 438 || 20.8 || 5.7 || 0.8 || 8.9 || align=center|
|-
|align="left"| || align="center"|G || align="left"|UTPA || align="center"|1 || align="center"| || 26 || 176 || 11 || 10 || 100 || 6.8 || 0.4 || 0.4 || 3.8 || align=center|
|-
|align="left"| || align="center"|G || align="left"|Louisville || align="center"|1 || align="center"| || 23 || 251 || 31 || 44 || 86 || 10.9 || 1.3 || 1.9 || 3.7 || align=center|
|-
|align="left"| || align="center"|G || align="left"|Washington || align="center"|4 || align="center"|– || 217 || 4,130 || 293 || 818 || 1,333 || 19.0 || 1.4 || 3.8 || 6.1 || align=center|
|-
|align="left"| || align="center"|G || align="left"|Saint Joseph's || align="center"|1 || align="center"| || 51 ||  ||  || 27 || 150 ||  ||  || 0.5 || 2.9 || align=center|
|-
|align="left"| || align="center"|F || align="left"|North Carolina || align="center"|2 || align="center"|– || 82 || 578 || 145 || 29 || 342 || 7.0 || 1.8 || 0.4 || 4.2 || align=center|
|-
|align="left"| || align="center"|F || align="left"|Notre Dame || align="center"|1 || align="center"| || 36 || 509 || 95 || 14 || 136 || 14.1 || 2.6 || 0.4 || 3.8 || align=center|
|-
|align="left"| || align="center"|F/C || align="left"|Louisville || align="center"|3 || align="center"|– || 126 || 2,222 || 657 || 67 || 632 || 17.6 || 5.2 || 0.5 || 5.0 || align=center|
|-
|align="left"| || align="center"|F/C || align="left"|Iowa || align="center"|1 || align="center"| || 3 || 4 || 1 || 1 || 0 || 1.3 || 0.3 || 0.3 || 0.0 || align=center|
|-
|align="left"| || align="center"|F || align="left"|USC || align="center"|1 || align="center"| || 22 || 354 || 92 || 16 || 132 || 16.1 || 4.2 || 0.7 || 6.0 || align=center|
|-
|align="left"| || align="center"|F/C || align="left"|Northwestern || align="center"|3 || align="center"|– || 114 || 909 || 286 || 48 || 398 || 8.0 || 2.5 || 0.4 || 3.5 || align=center|
|-
|align="left"| || align="center"|G || align="left"|Temple || align="center"|3 || align="center"|– || 93 ||  ||  || 70 || 271 ||  ||  || 0.8 || 2.9 || align=center|
|-
|align="left"| || align="center"|G/F || align="left"|Kansas || align="center"|4 || align="center"|–– || 172 || 3,068 || 474 || 159 || 983 || 17.8 || 2.8 || 0.9 || 5.7 || align=center|
|-
|align="left" bgcolor="#FFCC00"|+ || align="center"|G/F || align="left"|Michigan || align="center"|3 || align="center"|– || 241 || 7,905 || 1,131 || 627 || 4,631 || 32.8 || 4.7 || 2.6 || 19.2 || align=center|
|-
|align="left"| || align="center"|G || align="left"|Ohio State || align="center"|1 || align="center"| || 33 || 1,060 || 122 || 206 || 779 || 32.1 || 3.7 || 6.2 || 23.6 || align=center|
|}

S

|-
|align="left"| || align="center"|C || align="left"|Seton Hall || align="center"|2 || align="center"|– || 77 ||  ||  || 199 || 1,066 ||  ||  || 2.6 || 13.8 || align=center|
|-
|align="left"| || align="center"|G || align="left"|Wyoming || align="center"|1 || align="center"| || 2 ||  ||  || 0 || 4 ||  ||  || 0.0 || 2.0 || align=center|
|-
|align="left" bgcolor="#FFFF99"|^ || align="center"|F/C || align="left"|Virginia || align="center"|2 || align="center"|– || 90 || 2,044 || 597 || 162 || 839 || 22.7 || 6.6 || 1.8 || 9.3 || align=center|
|-
|align="left" bgcolor="#FFCC00"|+ || align="center"|F/C || align="left"|Texas Southern || align="center"|3 || align="center"|– || 214 || 6,968 || 2,002 || 241 || 2,729 || 32.6 || 9.4 || 1.1 || 12.8 || align=center|
|-
|align="left"| || align="center"|G || align="left"|Villanova || align="center"|1 || align="center"| || 12 || 82 || 13 || 9 || 31 || 6.8 || 1.1 || 0.8 || 2.6 || align=center|
|-
|align="left"| || align="center"|C || align="left"|Colorado State || align="center"|2 || align="center"|– || 94 || 1,244 || 447 || 55 || 405 || 13.2 || 4.8 || 0.6 || 4.3 || align=center|
|-
|align="left"| || align="center"|F || align="left"|Santa Clara || align="center"|2 || align="center"|– || 105 || 1,301 || 233 || 97 || 501 || 12.4 || 2.2 || 0.9 || 4.8 || align=center|
|-
|align="left"| || align="center"|C || align="left"|Syracuse || align="center"|2 || align="center"|– || 100 || 2,848 || 765 || 116 || 1,211 || 28.5 || 7.7 || 1.2 || 12.1 || align=center|
|-
|align="left"| || align="center"|G || align="left"|Saint Joseph's || align="center"|8 || align="center"|– || 482 || 5,032 || 878 || 1,553 || 3,455 || 27.3 || 3.5 || 3.2 || 7.2 || align=center|
|-
|align="left"| || align="center"|F || align="left"|Ole Miss || align="center"|1 || align="center"| || 16 || 128 || 38 || 12 || 49 || 8.0 || 2.4 || 0.8 || 3.1 || align=center|
|-
|align="left"| || align="center"|C || align="left"|Minnesota || align="center"|1 || align="center"| || 14 || 51 || 13 || 1 || 10 || 3.6 || 0.9 || 0.1 || 0.7 || align=center|
|-
|align="left"| || align="center"|G || align="left"|UC Santa Barbara || align="center"|1 || align="center"| || 39 || 1,028 || 151 || 173 || 251 || 26.4 || 3.9 || 4.4 || 6.4 || align=center|
|-
|align="left"| || align="center"|F || align="left"|Utah || align="center"|1 || align="center"| || 22 ||  ||  || 4 || 74 ||  ||  || 0.2 || 3.4 || align=center|
|-
|align="left"| || align="center"|G/F || align="left"|Jackson State || align="center"|9 || align="center"|– || 614 || 19,230 || 2,976 || 1,709 || 11,894 || 31.3 || 4.8 || 2.8 || 19.4 || align=center|
|-
|align="left"| || align="center"|G || align="left"|Maryland || align="center"|1 || align="center"| || 6 || 65 || 10 || 11 || 11 || 10.8 || 1.7 || 1.8 || 1.8 || align=center|
|-
|align="left"| || align="center"|F || align="left"|Providence || align="center"|1 || align="center"| || 19 || 196 || 46 || 16 || 54 || 10.3 || 2.4 || 0.8 || 2.8 || align=center|
|-
|align="left"| || align="center"|F || align="left"|Serbia || align="center"|2 || align="center"|– || 29 || 223 || 43 || 17 || 87 || 7.7 || 1.5 || 0.6 || 3.0 || align=center|
|-
|align="left"| || align="center"|G || align="left"|Kentucky || align="center"|2 || align="center"|– || 66 || 881 || 73 || 117 || 397 || 13.3 || 1.1 || 1.8 || 6.0 || align=center|
|-
|align="left"| || align="center"|F || align="left"|Cleveland State || align="center"|1 || align="center"| || 41 || 341 || 56 || 45 || 127 || 8.3 || 1.4 || 1.1 || 3.1 || align=center|
|-
|align="left"| || align="center"|G/F || align="left"|Louisville || align="center"|1 || align="center"| || 27 || 154 || 38 || 2 || 59 || 5.7 || 1.4 || 0.1 || 2.2 || align=center|
|-
|align="left"| || align="center"|G || align="left"|Wake Forest || align="center"|1 || align="center"| || 6 || 63 || 9 || 9 || 27 || 10.5 || 1.5 || 1.5 || 4.5 || align=center|
|-
|align="left"| || align="center"|F || align="left"|Maryland || align="center"|3 || align="center"|– || 211 || 7,552 || 1,734 || 271 || 3,590 || 35.8 || 8.2 || 1.3 || 17.0 || align=center|
|-
|align="left"| || align="center"|F/C || align="left"|Alcorn State || align="center"|9 || align="center"|– || 617 || 18,023 || 6,440 || 723 || 5,225 || 29.2 || 10.4 || 1.2 || 8.5 || align=center|
|-
|align="left"| || align="center"|G/F || align="left"|Jacksonville || align="center"|2 || align="center"|– || 137 || 2,955 || 547 || 284 || 1,549 || 21.6 || 4.0 || 2.1 || 11.3 || align=center|
|-
|align="left" bgcolor="#FFCC00"|+ || align="center"|G || align="left"|San Francisco || align="center"|6 || align="center"|– || 430 || 13,508 || 1,506 || 1,666 || 7,343 || 31.4 || 3.5 || 3.9 || 17.1 || align=center|
|-
|align="left"| || align="center"|C || align="left"|Canisius || align="center"|3 || align="center"|– || 20 || 135 || 42 || 2 || 35 || 6.8 || 2.1 || 0.1 || 1.8 || align=center|
|-
|align="left"| || align="center"|F || align="left"|Detroit Mercy || align="center"|2 || align="center"|– || 34 || 315 || 80 || 28 || 117 || 9.3 || 2.4 || 0.8 || 3.4 || align=center|
|-
|align="left"| || align="center"|F/C || align="left"|Florida || align="center"|3 || align="center"|– || 227 || 3,021 || 854 || 165 || 1,811 || 13.3 || 3.8 || 0.7 || 8.0 || align=center|
|-
|align="left"| || align="center"|F || align="left"|Villanova || align="center"|1 || align="center"| || 49 || 886 || 219 || 47 || 370 || 18.1 || 4.5 || 1.0 || 7.6 || align=center|
|-
|align="left"| || align="center"|F || align="left"|Northern Arizona || align="center"|2 || align="center"|– || 22 || 470 || 92 || 27 || 208 || 21.4 || 4.2 || 1.2 || 9.5 || align=center|
|-
|align="left"| || align="center"|C || align="left"|Louisville || align="center"|3 || align="center"|– || 166 || 2,511 || 682 || 38 || 572 || 15.1 || 4.1 || 0.2 || 3.4 || align=center|
|-
|align="left" bgcolor="#FFCC00"|+ || align="center"|G || align="left"|Alabama || align="center"|6 || align="center"|– || 400 || 16,009 || 1,725 || 1,862 || 8,032 || 40.0 || 4.3 || 4.7 || 20.1 || align=center|
|-
|align="left"| || align="center"|G || align="left"|Oklahoma State || align="center"|3 || align="center"|– || 119 || 3,110 || 295 || 432 || 1,321 || 26.1 || 2.5 || 3.6 || 11.1 || align=center|
|-
|align="left"| || align="center"|G/F || align="left"|Iowa State || align="center"|1 || align="center"| || 2 || 6 || 2 || 0 || 2 || 3.0 || 1.0 || 0.0 || 1.0 || align=center|
|-
|align="left"| || align="center"|F || align="left"|Montana || align="center"|1 || align="center"| || 4 || 20 || 14 || 3 || 4 || 5.0 || 3.5 || 0.8 || 1.0 || align=center|
|-
|align="left"| || align="center"|G || align="left"|Florida State || align="center"|3 || align="center"|– || 186 || 4,594 || 650 || 694 || 1,765 || 24.7 || 3.5 || 3.7 || 9.5 || align=center|
|}

T

|-
|align="left"| || align="center"|F || align="left"|Pittsburgh || align="center"|1 || align="center"| || 17 || 144 || 36 || 2 || 47 || 8.5 || 2.1 || 0.1 || 2.8 || align=center|
|-
|align="left"| || align="center"|F || align="left"|California || align="center"|1 || align="center"| || 10 || 37 || 12 || 1 || 11 || 3.7 || 1.2 || 0.1 || 1.1 || align=center|
|-
|align="left"| || align="center"|G/F || align="left"|Baylor || align="center"|6 || align="center"|– || 378 || 9,055 || 1,164 || 546 || 5,179 || 24.0 || 3.1 || 1.4 || 13.7 || align=center|
|-
|align="left"| || align="center"|F || align="left"|Saint Mary's || align="center"|2 || align="center"|– || 93 || 992 || 144 || 45 || 462 || 10.7 || 1.5 || 0.5 || 5.0 || align=center|
|-
|align="left"| || align="center"|G || align="left"|Eastern Michigan || align="center"|1 || align="center"| || 10 || 139 || 10 || 9 || 62 || 13.9 || 1.0 || 0.9 || 6.2 || align=center|
|-
|align="left"| || align="center"|F || align="left"|Providence || align="center"|1 || align="center"| || 4 || 27 || 3 || 4 || 6 || 6.8 || 0.8 || 1.0 || 1.5 || align=center|
|-
|align="left"| || align="center"|F || align="left"|San Diego State || align="center"|1 || align="center"| || 5 || 21 || 5 || 2 || 3 || 4.2 || 1.0 || 0.4 || 0.6 || align=center|
|-
|align="left"| || align="center"|F || align="left"|Louisville || align="center"|1 || align="center"| || 1 || 1 || 0 || 0 || 0 || 1.0 || 0.0 || 0.0 || 0.0 || align=center|
|-
|align="left"| || align="center"|F/C || align="left"|Rider || align="center"|1 || align="center"| || 28 || 179 || 54 || 19 || 60 || 6.4 || 1.9 || 0.7 || 2.1 || align=center|
|-
|align="left" bgcolor="#FBCEB1"|* || align="center"|G/F || align="left"|Washington State || align="center"|8 || align="center"|– || 615 || 20,340 || 2,130 || 1,416 || 11,995 || 33.1 || 3.5 || 2.3 || 19.5 || align=center|
|-
|align="left"| || align="center"|F || align="left"|Florida State || align="center"|1 || align="center"| || 22 || 314 || 57 || 11 || 131 || 14.3 || 2.6 || 0.5 || 6.0 || align=center|
|-
|align="left" bgcolor="#FFFF99"|^ (#42) || align="center"|F/C || align="left"|Bowling Green || align="center"|11 || align="center"|– || 757 || bgcolor="#CFECEC"|30,735 || bgcolor="#CFECEC"|12,771 || 2,070 || 13,191 || 40.6 || 16.9 || 2.7 || 17.4 || align=center|
|-
|align="left"| || align="center"|F/C || align="left"|Cleveland State || align="center"|1 || align="center"| || 72 || 730 || 184 || 24 || 257 || 10.1 || 2.6 || 0.3 || 3.6 || align=center|
|-
|align="left"| || align="center"|F/C || align="left"|Arizona || align="center"|3 || align="center"|– || 167 || 3,028 || 693 || 155 || 1,206 || 18.1 || 4.1 || 0.9 || 7.2 || align=center|
|-
|align="left"| || align="center"|F/C || align="left"|Creighton || align="center"|1 || align="center"| || 44 || 1,423 || 319 || 87 || 539 || 32.3 || 7.3 || 2.0 || 12.3 || align=center|
|-
|align="left"| || align="center"|F || align="left"|LIU Brooklyn || align="center"|1 || align="center"| || 13 ||  ||  || 12 || 35 ||  ||  || 0.9 || 2.7 || align=center|
|-
|align="left"| || align="center"|F || align="left"|Venezuela || align="center"|1 || align="center"| || 17 || 109 || 12 || 3 || 53 || 6.4 || 0.7 || 0.2 || 3.1 || align=center|
|-
|align="left" bgcolor="#CCFFCC"|x || align="center"|F || align="left"|Marquette || align="center"|2 || align="center"|– || 66 || 1,379 || 286 || 176 || 370 || 20.9 || 4.3 || 2.7 || 5.6 || align=center|
|-
|align="left"| || align="center"|G || align="left"|UCLA || align="center"|2 || align="center"|– || 140 || 1,930 || 144 || 207 || 710 || 13.8 || 1.0 || 1.5 || 5.1 || align=center|
|-
|align="left"| || align="center"|F || align="left"|Georgia || align="center"|1 || align="center"| || 12 || 62 || 12 || 6 || 16 || 5.2 || 1.0 || 0.5 || 1.3 || align=center|
|-
|align="left"| || align="center"|F || align="left"|Gonzaga || align="center"|2 || align="center"|– || 121 || 2,568 || 551 || 256 || 677 || 21.2 || 4.6 || 2.1 || 5.6 || align=center|
|-
|align="left"| || align="center"|F || align="left"|Akron || align="center"|5 || align="center"|– || 204 || 2,840 || 722 || 114 || 1,061 || 13.9 || 3.5 || 0.6 || 5.2 || align=center|
|-
|align="left"| || align="center"|C || align="left"|San Diego HS (CA) || align="center"|2 || align="center"|– || 62 || 631 || 157 || 17 || 227 || 10.2 || 2.5 || 0.3 || 3.7 || align=center|
|}

U to Z

|-
|align="left"| || align="center"|F/C || align="left"|Baylor || align="center"|2 || align="center"|– || 96 || 1,857 || 328 || 71 || 446 || 19.3 || 3.4 || 0.7 || 4.6 || align=center|
|-
|align="left"| || align="center"|G || align="left"|Utah || align="center"|1 || align="center"| || 23 || 252 || 28 || 26 || 128 || 11.0 || 1.2 || 1.1 || 5.6 || align=center|
|-
|align="left"| || align="center"|G || align="left"|Cincinnati || align="center"|1 || align="center"| || 39 || 1,255 || 104 || 206 || 490 || 32.2 || 2.7 || 5.3 || 12.6 || align=center|
|-
|align="left"| || align="center"|F/C || align="left"|Brazil || align="center"|2 || align="center"|– || 36 || 278 || 77 || 25 || 76 || 7.7 || 2.1 || 0.7 || 2.1 || align=center|
|-
|align="left"| || align="center"|F || align="left"|Memphis || align="center"|1 || align="center"| || 22 || 322 || 102 || 18 || 114 || 14.6 || 4.6 || 0.8 || 5.2 || align=center|
|-
|align="left"| || align="center"|F || align="left"|Fresno State || align="center"|1 || align="center"| || 61 || 749 || 160 || 29 || 206 || 12.3 || 2.6 || 0.5 || 3.4 || align=center|
|-
|align="left"| || align="center"|G || align="left"|UNLV || align="center"|1 || align="center"| || 11 || 123 || 15 || 34 || 8 || 11.2 || 1.4 || 3.1 || 0.7 || align=center|
|-
|align="left"| || align="center"|G || align="left"|Memphis || align="center"|1 || align="center"| || 1 || 7 || 0 || 1 || 4 || 7.0 || 0.0 || 1.0 || 4.0 || align=center|
|-
|align="left"| || align="center"|F || align="left"|Stanford || align="center"|1 || align="center"| || 10 || 72 || 15 || 8 || 20 || 7.2 || 1.5 || 0.8 || 2.0 || align=center|
|-
|align="left"| || align="center"|G/F || align="left"|Tennessee || align="center"|1 || align="center"| || 64 || 2,067 || 257 || 220 || 421 || 32.3 || 4.0 || 3.4 || 6.6 || align=center|
|-
|align="left"| || align="center"|G || align="left"|Pittsburgh || align="center"|1 || align="center"| || 39 || 625 || 66 || 99 || 185 || 16.0 || 1.7 || 2.5 || 4.7 || align=center|
|-
|align="left"| || align="center"|G/F || align="left"|Pepperdine || align="center"|2 || align="center"|– || 81 || 1,385 || 284 || 169 || 647 || 17.1 || 3.5 || 2.1 || 8.0 || align=center|
|-
|align="left"| || align="center"|C || align="left"|NC State || align="center"|2 || align="center"|– || 43 || 471 || 121 || 19 || 165 || 11.0 || 2.8 || 0.4 || 3.8 || align=center|
|-
|align="left"| || align="center"|F/C || align="left"|American || align="center"|1 || align="center"| || 6 || 56 || 19 || 0 || 16 || 9.3 || 3.2 || 0.0 || 2.7 || align=center|
|-
|align="left"| || align="center"|G || align="left"|Tennessee || align="center"|3 || align="center"|– || 174 || 4,039 || 393 || 421 || 1,515 || 23.2 || 2.3 || 2.4 || 8.7 || align=center|
|-
|align="left"| || align="center"|F || align="left"|Southern Miss || align="center"|1 || align="center"| || 31 || 1,035 || 258 || 49 || 331 || 33.4 || 8.3 || 1.6 || 10.7 || align=center|
|-
|align="left" bgcolor="#FFFF99"|^ || align="center"|F/C || align="left"|Michigan || align="center"|2 || align="center"| || 85 || 2,564 || 726 || 290 || 1,368 || 30.2 || 8.5 || 3.4 || 16.1 || align=center|
|-
|align="left"| || align="center"|G || align="left"|VCU || align="center"|1 || align="center"| || 7 || 46 || 4 || 5 || 12 || 6.6 || 0.6 || 0.7 || 1.7 || align=center|
|-
|align="left"| || align="center"|C || align="left"|Washington || align="center"|1 || align="center"| || 14 || 142 || 36 || 4 || 50 || 10.1 || 2.6 || 0.3 || 3.6 || align=center|
|-
|align="left"| || align="center"|G || align="left"|Czech Republic || align="center"|1 || align="center"| || 37 || 234 || 28 || 27 || 61 || 6.3 || 0.8 || 0.7 || 1.6 || align=center|
|-
|align="left"| || align="center"|F/C || align="left"|Xavier || align="center"|2 || align="center"|– || 141 || 1,853 || 441 || 289 || 811 || 13.1 || 3.1 || 2.0 || 5.8 || align=center|
|-
|align="left"| || align="center"|G/F || align="left"|Villanova || align="center"|1 || align="center"| || 29 || 271 || 35 || 28 || 92 || 9.3 || 1.2 || 1.0 || 3.2 || align=center|
|-
|align="left" bgcolor="#FFFF99"|^ || align="center"|G || align="left"|Kansas || align="center"|2 || align="center"|– || 107 || 2,935 || 253 || 372 || 1,128 || 27.4 || 2.4 || 3.5 || 10.5 || align=center|
|-
|align="left"| || align="center"|F || align="left"|Charlotte || align="center"|1 || align="center"| || 16 || 146 || 15 || 8 || 57 || 9.1 || 0.9 || 0.5 || 3.6 || align=center|
|-
|align="left"| || align="center"|G || align="left"|Arizona State || align="center"|1 || align="center"| || 4 || 43 || 0 || 2 || 22 || 10.8 || 0.0 || 0.5 || 5.5 || align=center|
|-
|align="left"| || align="center"|G || align="left"|Tennessee || align="center"|1 || align="center"| || 35 || 462 || 28 || 49 || 218 || 13.2 || 0.8 || 1.4 || 6.2 || align=center|
|-
|align="left"| || align="center"|F/C || align="left"|Marquette || align="center"|5 || align="center"|– || 310 || 5,815 || 1,538 || 137 || 2,125 || 18.8 || 5.0 || 0.4 || 6.9 || align=center|
|-
|align="left" bgcolor="#FBCEB1"|* || align="center"|F || align="left"|Kansas || align="center"|2 || align="center"|– || 83 || 2,767 || 402 || 210 || 1,553 || 33.3 || 4.8 || 2.5 || 18.7 || align=center|
|-
|align="left" bgcolor="#FFFF99"|^ || align="center"|G/F || align="left"|UCLA || align="center"|3 || align="center"|– || 240 || 7,810 || 1,969 || 561 || 3,968 || 32.5 || 8.2 || 2.3 || 16.5 || align=center|
|-
|align="left"| || align="center"|G || align="left"|Davidson || align="center"|1 || align="center"| || 9 || 140 || 15 || 3 || 37 || 15.6 || 1.7 || 0.3 || 4.1 || align=center|
|-
|align="left"| || align="center"|G || align="left"|USC || align="center"|2 || align="center"|– || 159 || 3,658 || 392 || 532 || 1,665 || 23.0 || 2.5 || 3.3 || 10.5 || align=center|
|-
|align="left"| || align="center"|F || align="left"|Washington State || align="center"|1 || align="center"| || 5 || 25 || 6 || 0 || 7 || 5.0 || 1.2 || 0.0 || 1.4 || align=center|
|-
|align="left"| || align="center"|G || align="left"|UConn || align="center"|1 || align="center"| || 9 || 54 || 4 || 13 || 12 || 6.0 || 0.4 || 1.4 || 1.3 || align=center|
|-
|align="left"| || align="center"|G/F || align="left"|Utah State || align="center"|2 || align="center"|– || 127 || 2,114 || 321 || 101 || 1,184 || 16.6 || 2.5 || 0.8 || 9.3 || align=center|
|-
|align="left"| || align="center"|F || align="left"|VMI || align="center"|2 || align="center"|– || 104 || 2,408 || 326 || 187 || 1,103 || 23.2 || 3.1 || 1.8 || 10.6 || align=center|
|-
|align="left"| || align="center"|G || align="left"|West Virginia || align="center"|5 || align="center"|– || 390 || 9,664 || 840 || 1,573 || 4,161 || 24.8 || 2.2 || 4.0 || 10.7 || align=center|
|-
|align="left"| || align="center"|F || align="left"|Arizona State || align="center"|3 || align="center"|– || 141 || 2,665 || 714 || 85 || 1,012 || 18.9 || 5.1 || 0.6 || 7.2 || align=center|
|-
|align="left"| || align="center"|F/C || align="left"|Michigan State || align="center"|1 || align="center"| || 28 || 778 || 218 || 19 || 315 || 27.8 || 7.8 || 0.7 || 11.3 || align=center|
|-
|align="left"| || align="center"|G || align="left"|Western Carolina || align="center"|1 || align="center"| || 16 || 143 || 16 || 12 || 17 || 8.9 || 1.0 || 0.8 || 1.1 || align=center|
|-
|align="left"| || align="center"|G || align="left"|Virginia || align="center"|1 || align="center"| || 74 || 1,260 || 131 || 217 || 325 || 17.0 || 1.8 || 2.9 || 4.4 || align=center|
|-
|align="left"| || align="center"|F || align="left"|Stanford || align="center"|1 || align="center"| || 11 || 68 || 26 || 2 || 27 || 6.2 || 2.4 || 0.2 || 2.5 || align=center|
|-
|align="left" bgcolor="#CCFFCC"|x || align="center"|C || align="left"|Memphis || align="center"|1 || align="center"| || 39 || 836 || 226 || 26 || 448 || 21.4 || 5.8 || .7 || 11.5 || align=center|
|-
|align="left"| || align="center"|F || align="left"|Nevada || align="center"|2 || align="center"|– || 99 || 1,432 || 257 || 70 || 450 || 14.5 || 2.6 || 0.7 || 4.5 || align=center|
|-
|align="left"| || align="center"|F/C || align="left"|West Virginia || align="center"|1 || align="center"| || 60 || 1,001 || 187 || 36 || 319 || 16.7 || 3.1 || 0.6 || 5.3 || align=center|
|-
|align="left"| || align="center"|F/C || align="left"|North Carolina || align="center"|3 || align="center"|– || 98 || 1,259 || 297 || 35 || 557 || 12.8 || 3.0 || 0.4 || 5.7 || align=center|
|-
|align="left"| || align="center"|F || align="left"|Dayton || align="center"|1 || align="center"| || 24 || 186 || 45 || 4 || 70 || 7.8 || 1.9 || 0.2 || 2.9 || align=center|
|-
|align="left"| || align="center"|G/F || align="left"|South Kent School (CT) || align="center"|2 || align="center"|– || 143 || 4,797 || 709 || 336 || 1,973 || 33.5 || 5.0 || 2.3 || 13.8 || align=center|
|-
|align="left"| || align="center"|G/F || align="left"|USC || align="center"|1 || align="center"| || 80 || 1,393 || 125 || 36 || 581 || 17.4 || 1.6 || 0.5 || 7.3 || align=center|
|-
|align="left"| || align="center"|C || align="left"|Stanford || align="center"|1 || align="center"| || 25 || 137 || 35 || 5 || 54 || 5.5 || 1.4 || 0.2 || 2.2 || align=center|
|-
|align="left"| || align="center"|F/C || align="left"|St. John's || align="center"|2 || align="center"|– || 138 || 2,912 || 586 || 186 || 1,023 || 21.1 || 4.2 || 1.3 || 7.4 || align=center|
|}

References
General

Specific

National Basketball Association all-time rosters
roster
Philadelphia Warriors players
San Francisco Warriors players
Golden State Warriors players